= Presidency of Ulysses S. Grant =

U.S. presidential administration from 1869 to 1877

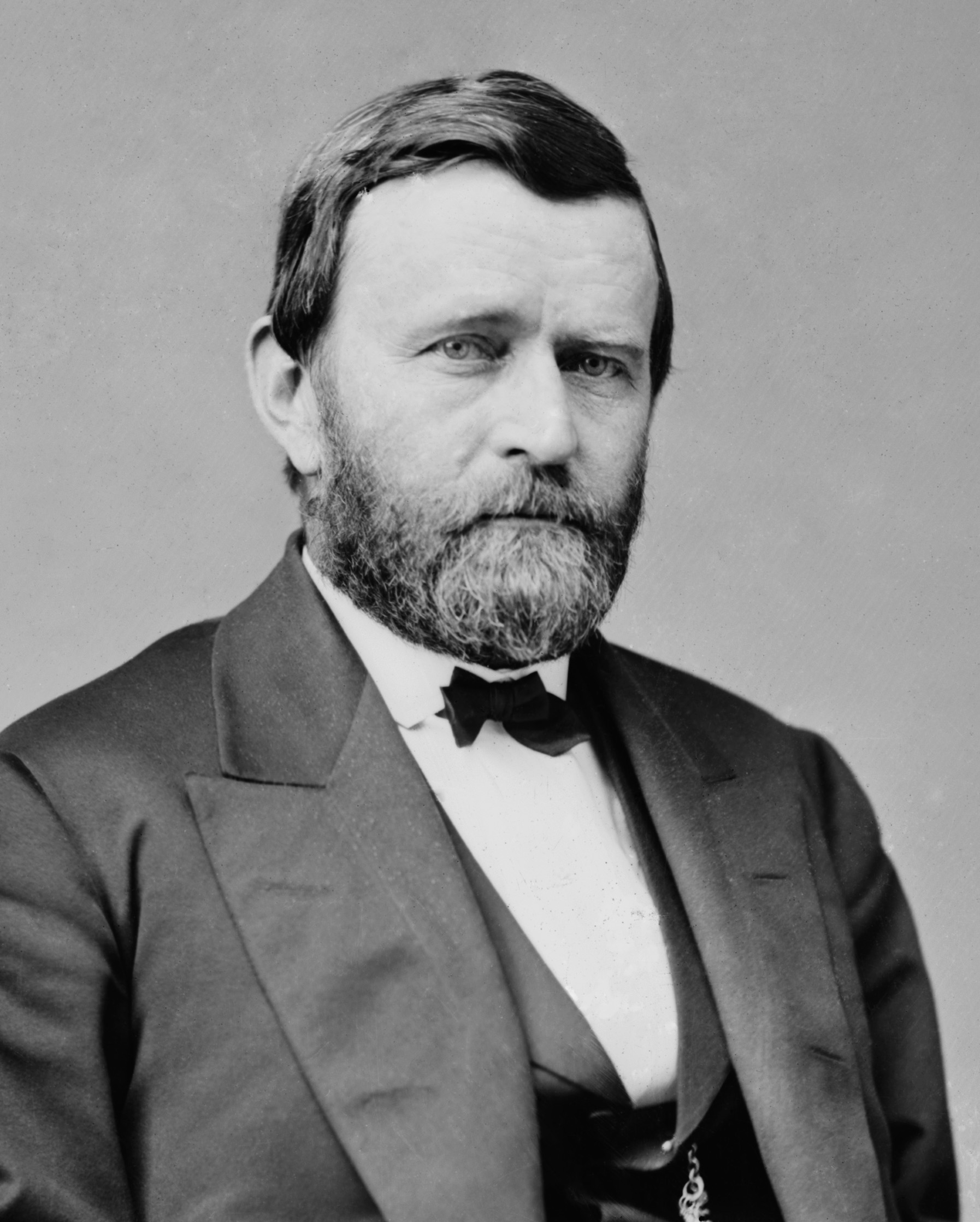
- Presidency of Ulysses S. Grant; March 4, 1869 – March 4, 1877
- Vice President: Schuyler Colfax (1869–1873); Henry Wilson (1873–1875); None (1875–1877)
- Cabinet: See list
- Party: Republican
- Election: 1868; 1872
- Seat: White House
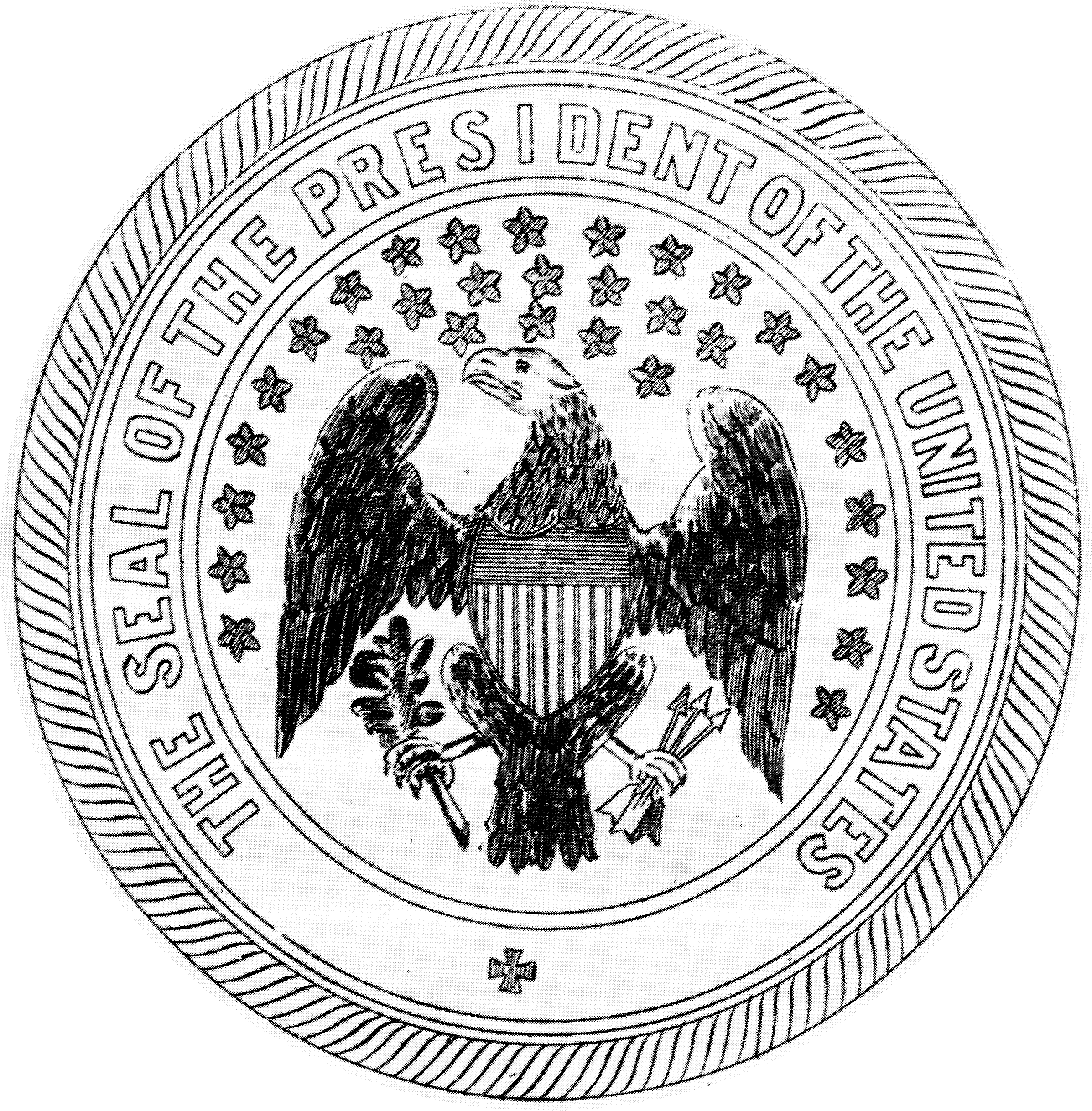
- Seal of the president (1850–1894)

Ulysses S. Grant served as the 18th president of the United States from March 4, 1869 to March 4, 1877. A Republican, Grant took office after winning the 1868 election, and secured a second term in 1872. He presided over the Reconstruction Era and the 1876 U.S. Centennial.

By the year 1870, all former Confederate states had rejoined the United States and regained their representation in Congress. However, Democrats and former slave owners opposed the citizenship of freedmen as outlined in the Fourteenth Amendment. They also refused to grant voting rights as stipulated by the Fifteenth Amendment. In response, Congress enacted three Force Acts, which empowered the federal government to intervene when states neglected the rights of ex-slaves. The Ku Klux Klan, which originated in 1865, instilled fear throughout the Southern United States, specifically targeting African Americans. In collaboration with Congress, President Grant established the Department of Justice and appointed Amos T. Akerman as the Attorney General. This led to thousands of Klan indictments and resulted in hundreds of convictions.

Grant's cabinet picks were mostly mixed. Still, he chose a few standouts like Secretary of State Hamilton Fish, Attorney General Amos T. Akerman, and Seneca Indian Eli Parker as Commissioner of Indian Affairs. The nation thrived in prosperity until the Panic of 1873 struck. His two terms were plagued by scandals, including allegations of corruption, bribery, fraud, and favoritism. Grant sometimes responded by appointing reformers to address high-profile cases like the infamous Whiskey Ring. He pushed civil service reform farther than past presidents. He formed the country's first Civil Service Commission. In 1872, Grant approved a law to create Yellowstone National Park.

The US stayed mostly at peace with the world during Grant's eight years as president. His foreign policy, however, was inconsistent. Clashes with Native American tribes in the West dragged on. Secretary of State Hamilton Fish oversaw the Treaty of Washington. It mended ties with Britain and fixed the tough Alabama Claims. The Virginius Affair with Spain ended without fight. Grant sought to annex the Caribbean island of Santo Domingo, but Senator Charles Sumner's opposition ended the attempt. Grant's image as president grew in the 21st century. His defeating the Klan and stand for African American civil rights helped the most. Grant's reputation in historical rankings of presidents of the United States suffered considerably in the 20th century, however, beginning in the 21st century, he has generally been ranked as an average to above-average president.

== Election of 1868 ==
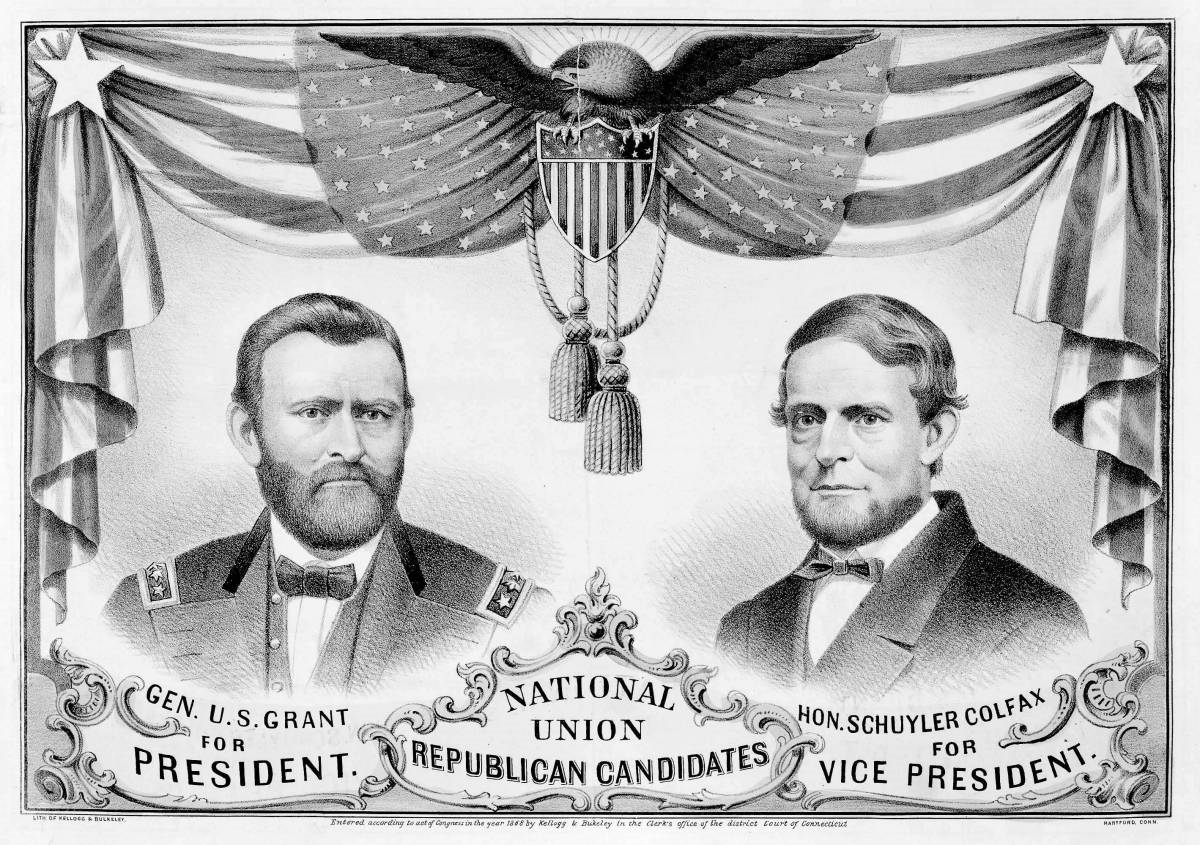
Grant-Colfax campaign poster 1868

Ulysses S. Grant's ascent in political favor among Republicans can be attributed primarily to his effective military command that led to the defeat of Robert E. Lee, along with his notable departure from President Andrew Johnson's policies. His candidacy for the presidency faced no opposition. During the Republican Party Convention in Chicago in May 1868, delegates unanimously selected Grant as their candidate for president. Schuyler Colfax, the House Speaker, was nominated as the vice-presidential candidate.

Electoral vote results, 1868

The 1868 Republican Party platform advocated for the enfranchisement of African Americans in the South but left the issue open in the North. It opposed the use of greenbacks and promoted the use of gold to redeem U.S. bonds. The platform encouraged immigration and endorsed full rights for naturalized citizens. Additionally, it favored a more radical reconstruction as distinct from the more lenient approaches supported by President Andrew Johnson. In Grant's acceptance letter, he stated: "Let us have peace." (Note: Historian Brooks Simpson says these four simple words expressed the "innermost desires of many Americans.") These words became the popular mantra of the Republican Party. Grant won an overwhelming Electoral College victory, receiving 214 votes compared to the 80 received by the Democratic nominee, Horatio Seymour. Grant also garnered 52.7 percent of the popular vote nationwide. Six southern states, controlled by Republicans, bolstered Grant's margin of victory, while many former Confederates remained barred from voting.

== First term (1869–1873) ==
=== Inaugural address 1869 ===
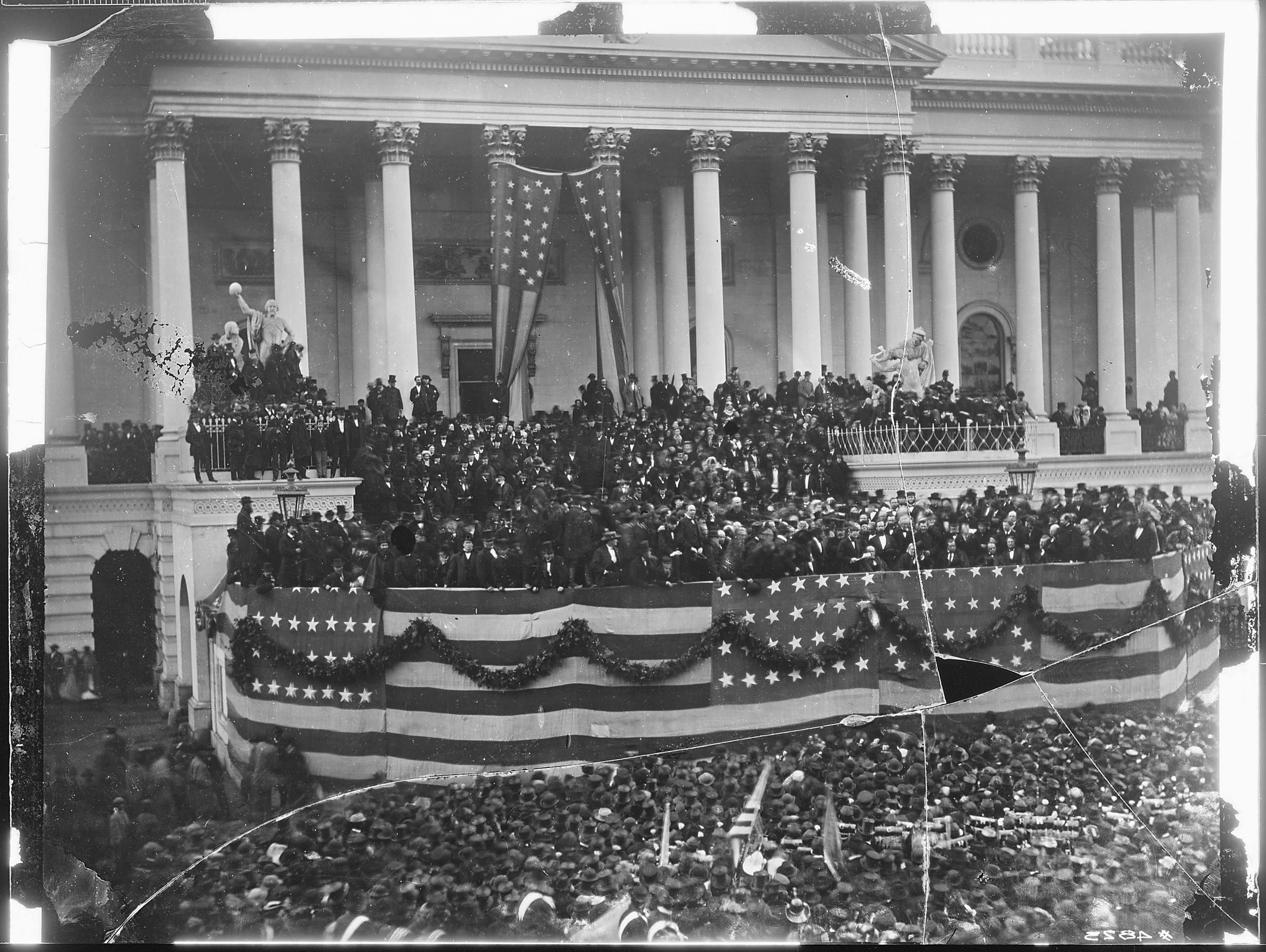
Inauguration of President Grant 1869

On March 4, 1869, Grant gave his inaugural address. He outlined four main goals. First, he pledged to tackle Reconstruction "calmly, devoid of prejudice, animosity, or regional pride; keeping in mind that the greatest good for the greatest number is the goal to be achieved." Next, he reviewed the nation's money woes. He pushed for "a return to a specie basis." Then, he covered foreign policy. He stressed equal safety for all Americans abroad. Last, Grant backed the 15th Amendment. It granted black men, including ex-slaves, voting rights in the Constitution.

=== Cabinet ===
Grant's cabinet choices shocked the nation. Grant skipped the usual talks with top Republicans and picked his team in secret. Early nominations drew both cheers and jeers. Grant named his friend Elihu B. Washburne Secretary of State, who promptly quit only after serving eleven days. A week later, Grant made him Minister to France. Grant replaced Washburne with Hamilton Fish, a conservative, who had governed New York. Grant first tapped wealthy merchant Alexander T. Stewart for Treasury Secretary. A federal law that banned commerce ties blocked Stewart's nomination. Grant then picked ex-Congressman George S. Boutwell from Massachusetts. (Note: Stewart had bought Grant's old home on I street for $65,000 one month before his nomination, causing an appearance of influence peddling, which Grant later denied.) For War Secretary, Grant chose old aide John A. Rawlins. Rawlins died in office from tuberculosis in September 1869. Six weeks later, Grant named William W. Belknap as his replacement.

Grant picked Ebenezer Rockwood Hoar as U.S. Attorney General. Hoar was an associate justice on the Massachusetts Supreme Judicial Court. He chose Adolph E. Borie for Secretary of the Navy. Borie was a businessman from Philadelphia. Borie quit on June 25, 1869. He blamed the job's stress. His one accomplishment, Borie racially integrated the Washington Navy Yard. Grant then picked George M. Robeson to replace him. Robeson once worked as a New Jersey prosecutor. For Secretary of the Interior, Grant named former Ohio governor and senator Jacob D. Cox. Grant chose John A.J. Creswell for Postmaster General. Creswell had served as a U.S. Senator from Maryland. He gets credit for integrating the U.S. Post Office by race.

=== Tenure of Office Act modified ===
In March 1869, President Grant declared that he wanted to repeal the Tenure of Office Act (1867), calling it a “stride toward a revolution in our free system.” The law barred the president from removing executive officials without the Senate’s approval. Grant regarded it as a major restriction on presidential authority. To advance repeal, he chose to make no new appointments, other than to fill vacancies, until the law was overturned. On March 9, 1869, the House voted to repeal the act in full, but the Senate Judiciary Committee rejected the bill and proposed only a temporary suspension. After Grant objected, Senate Republicans met in caucus and proposed granting the president complete authority to appoint and dismiss cabinet members. The Senate Judiciary Committee drafted a new bill, and the House and Senate arrived at an ambiguous compromise. Grant signed the measure on April 5, having secured nearly everything he sought.

=== Reconstruction ===
==== Fifteenth Amendment ====
Grant worked to ensure ratification of the Fifteenth Amendment, which was approved by Congress and sent to the states during the last days of the Johnson administration. The amendment prohibited the federal and state governments from denying a citizen the right to vote based on that citizen's "race, color, or previous condition of servitude." On December 24, 1869, Grant established federal military rule in Georgia and restored black legislators who had been expelled from the state legislature. On February 3, 1870, the amendment reached the requisite number of state ratifications (then 27) and was certified as the Fifteenth Amendment to the United States Constitution. Grant hailed its ratification as "a measure of grander importance than any other one act of the kind from the foundation of our free government to the present day". By mid-1870, former Confederate states Virginia, Texas, Mississippi, and Georgia had ratified the 15th Amendment and were readmitted to the Union.

==== Department of Justice ====
On June 22, 1870, Grant signed a bill into law passed by Congress that created the Department of Justice and the Office of Solicitor General, to aid the Attorney General. Grant appointed Amos T. Akerman as Attorney General and Benjamin H. Bristow as America's first Solicitor General. Both Akerman and Bristow used the Department of Justice to vigorously prosecute Ku Klux Klan members in the early 1870s. Grant appointed Hiram C. Whitley as director of the new Secret Service Agency in 1869, after he had successfully arrested 12 Klansmen in Georgia who had murdered a leading local Republican official. Whitley used talented detectives who infiltrated and broke up KKK units in North Carolina and Alabama. However, they could not penetrate the main hotbed of KKK activity in upstate South Carolina. Grant sent in Army troops, but Whitley's agents learned they were lying low until the troops were withdrawn. Whitley warned Akerman, who convinced Grant to declare martial law and send in US marshals backed by federal troops to arrest 500 Klansmen; hundreds more fled the state, and hundreds of others surrendered in return for leniency.

In the first few years of Grant's first term in office, there were 1000 indictments against Klan members, with over 550 convictions from the Department of Justice. By 1871, there were 3000 indictments and 600 convictions, with most only serving brief sentences while the ringleaders were imprisoned for up to five years in the federal penitentiary in Albany, New York. The result was a dramatic decrease in violence in the South. Akerman gave credit to Grant and told a friend that no one was "better" or "stronger" than Grant when it came to prosecuting terrorists. Akerman's successor, George H. Williams, in December 1871, continued to prosecute the Klan throughout 1872 until the spring of 1873 during Grant's second term in office. Williams's clemency and moratorium on Klan prosecutions was due in part to the fact that the Justice Department, having been inundated by Klan outrage cases, did not have the effective manpower to continue the prosecutions.

==== Naturalization Act of 1870 ====
On July 14, 1870, Grant signed the Naturalization Act of 1870 into law, enabling people of African descent to become citizens of the United States. The act amended the Naturalization Act of 1790, which had limited eligibility for U.S. citizenship to white people of good moral character. It also provided for the prosecution of applicants who used fictitious names, made false statements, or assumed the identities of deceased individuals to obtain citizenship.

==== Enforcement Acts (1870-1871) ====
To enforce the 15th Amendment, Grant signed the Force Act of 1870 into law on May 31, 1870. This law was designed to stop white Redeemers from attacking or threatening African Americans, called "Klan outrages". This act placed severe penalties on persons who used intimidation, bribery, or physical assault to prevent black citizens in rural aries from voting and placed elections under Federal jurisdiction. The second Force Act of 1871 strengthened the voting rights of blacks in large cities throughout the South. However, violence against blacks in the South remained persistent. On January 13, 1871, Grant submitted to Congress a report on violent acts committed by the Ku Klux Klan in the South. On March 23, Grant told a reluctant Congress the situation in the South was dire and federal legislation was needed that would "secure life, liberty, and property, and the enforcement of the law, in all parts of the United States." Grant stated that the U.S. mail and the collection of revenue were in jeopardy.

Having the support of President Grant, and having investigated the Klan's activities, Congress passed a third stronger act, The Ku Klux Klan Act in April, 1871. This law allowed the president to suspend habeas corpus on "armed combinations" and conspiracies by the Klan. The Act also empowered the president "to arrest and break up disguised night marauders". The actions of the Klan were defined as high crimes and acts of rebellion against the United States. On October 12, 1871, Grant ordered the Ku Klux Klan to disperse from South Carolina and lay down their arms under the authority of the Enforcement Acts. On October 17, 1871, Grant issued a suspension of habeas corpus in all 9 counties in South Carolina. Grant ordered federal troops into the state, who then captured the Klan, which was vigorously prosecuted. Gen. Akerman and Sol. Gen. Bristow. However, other white supremacist groups emerged, including the White League and the Red Shirts.

==== Amnesty Act of 1872 ====
Texas was readmitted into the Union on March 30, 1870, Mississippi was readmitted on February 23, 1870, and Virginia on January 26, 1870. Georgia became the last Confederate state to be readmitted into the Union on July 15, 1870. All members of the House of Representatives and Senate were seated from the 10 Confederate states that seceded. Technically, the United States was again a united country. To ease tensions, Grant signed the Amnesty Act of 1872 on May 23, 1872, which gave amnesty to former Confederates. This act allowed most former Confederates, who before the war had taken an oath to uphold the Constitution of the United States, to hold elected public office. Only 500 former Confederates remained unpardonable and therefore forbidden to hold elected public office.

=== Financial policy ===
==== Public Credit Act ====
On taking office, Grant's first move was signing the Act to Strengthen the Public Credit, which the Republican Congress had just passed. It ensured that all public debts, particularly war bonds, would be paid only in gold rather than in greenbacks. The price of gold on the New York exchange fell to $130 per ounce – the lowest point since the suspension of specie payment in 1862.

==== Federal wages raised ====
On May 19, 1869, Grant protected the wages of those working for the U.S. Government. In 1868, a law was passed that reduced the government working day to 8 hours; however, much of the law was later repealed, allowing day wages to also be reduced. To protect workers, Grant signed an executive order that "no reduction shall be made in the wages" regardless of the reduction in hours for the government day workers.

==== Boutwell reforms ====
Treasury Secretary George S. Boutwell reorganized and reformed the United States Treasury by discharging unnecessary employees, started sweeping changes in Bureau of Engraving and Printing to protect the currency from counterfeiters, and revitalized tax collections to hasten the collection of revenue. These changes soon led the Treasury to have a monthly surplus. By May 1869, Boutwell reduced the national debt by $12 million. By September, the national debt was reduced by $50 million, which was achieved by selling the growing gold surplus at weekly auctions for greenbacks and buying back wartime bonds with the currency. The New York Tribune wanted the government to buy more bonds and greenbacks, and the New York Times praised the Grant administration's debt policy.

=== Foreign policy ===
==== Attempted annexation of Santo Domingo ====
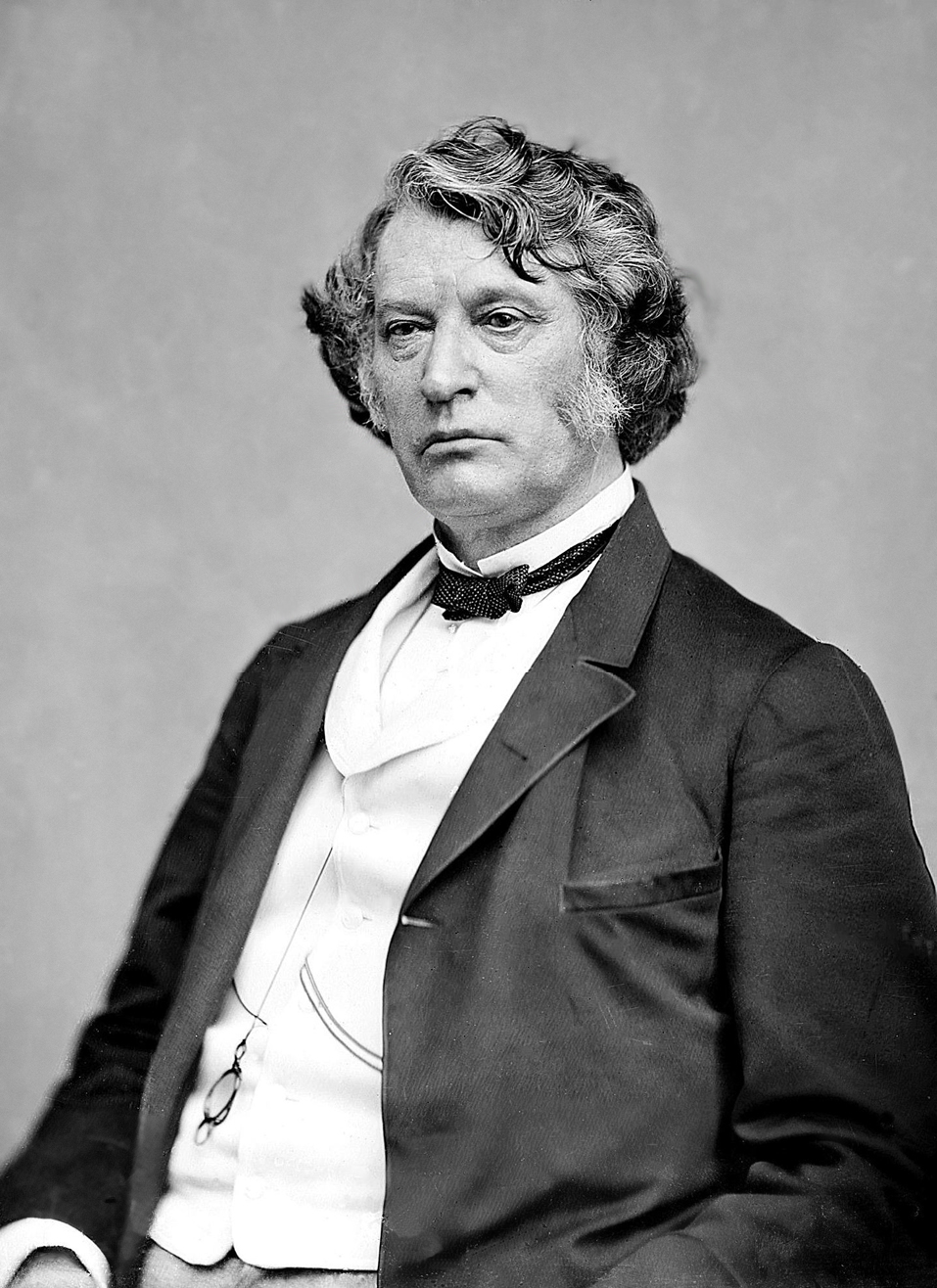
Charles Sumner, Republican Senator from Massachusetts and chair of the Foreign Relations Committee.

In May 1869, Grant began an effort to annex Santo Domingo (later known as the Dominican Republic). That summer, he sent Orville E. Babcock to assess conditions on the island and negotiate purchase terms with President Buenaventura Báez. Babcock returned in mid-September with proposals for annexation, and Fish subsequently prepared the treaties. Báez signed them on November 19, 1869. Under the agreement, the United States would pay $1.5 million toward the Dominican Republic's public debt and annex Santo Domingo as a U.S. territory. A separate agreement granted the United States a 50-year lease on Samaná Bay for an annual payment of $150,000. The treaties also provided for U.S. protection against foreign intervention. On January 10, 1870, the Senate received the treaties for consideration.

Grant viewed the island would provide a safe haven for formerly enslaved people, encouraging southern black workers to migrate there. Grant also expected the island nation to increase U.S. exports and reduce the trade imbalance. On March 15, 1870, the Senate Foreign Relations Committee, chaired by Charles Sumner, voted against the treaties. Grant continued to press for ratification, urging Congress to approve the Dominican treaties on May 31, 1870. Sumner led the Senate opposition, and one month later the treaties were defeated. (Note: Grant's cabinet was divided over the Santo Domingo annexation effort. Bancroft Davis, assistant to Secretary of State Hamilton Fish, leaked State Department information to Senator Sumner.) Not to be outdone, at Grant's urging Congress formed a special team in January 1871 to study the island. Grant named famed abolitionist and ex-slave Frederick Douglass as the team's secretary. In March 1871, at Grant's bidding, the Senate ousted Sumner, and named Simon Cameron chair of the Foreign Relations Committee instead. (Note: Sumner later blocked Grant's annexation push. Grant hit back by ruining Sumner's influence.) The special team released its report in April 1871. It said locals wanted annexation and the island would aid the United States. (Note: Grant welcomed the team back at the White House to mark their return. He left out Frederick Douglass. Black leaders grew angry. Greeley raised the snub during the 1872 election. Horace Greeley. Douglass felt hurt over the slight. Still, he remained loyal to Grant and the Republicans.) Congress, however, refused to take another look at annexation.

==== Cuban insurrection ====
The Cuban rebellion 1868–1878 against Spanish rule, called by historians the Ten Years' War, gained wide sympathy in the U.S. Juntas based in New York raised money, and smuggled men and munitions to Cuba, while energetically spreading propaganda in American newspapers. The Grant administration turned a blind eye to this violation of American neutrality. In 1869, Grant was urged by popular opinion to support rebels in Cuba with military assistance and to give them U.S. diplomatic recognition. Fish, however, wanted stability and favored the Spanish government, without publicly challenging the popular anti-Spanish American viewpoint. They reassured European governments that the U.S. did not want to annex Cuba. Grant and Fish gave lip service to Cuban independence, called for an end to slavery in Cuba, and quietly opposed American military intervention. Fish worked diligently against popular pressure and was able to keep Grant from officially recognizing Cuban independence because it would have endangered negotiations with Britain over the Alabama Claims.

==== Treaty of Washington ====
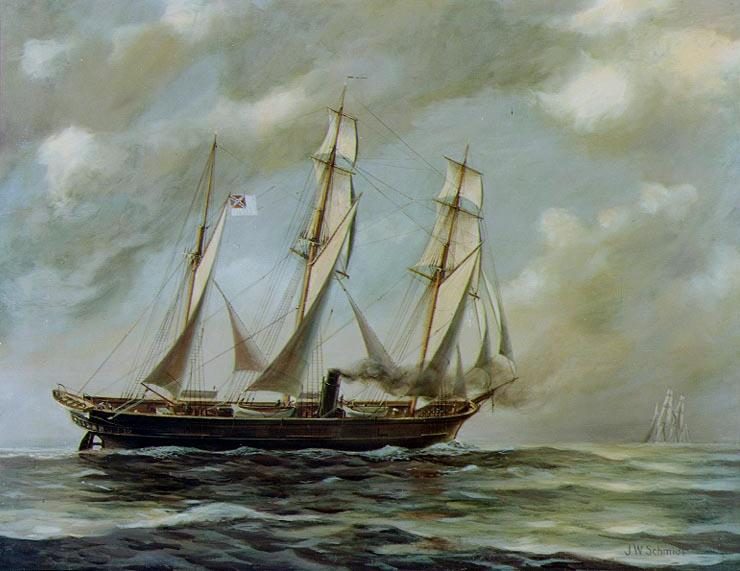
Confederate Warship CSS Alabama Active service (1862–1864)

Historians have generally lauded the Grant administration's settlement of the Alabama controversy, a great achievement that instituted international arbitration to settle international disputes. Grant's able Secretary of State Hamilton Fish had orchestrated many of the events leading up to the treaty. Previously, Secretary of State William H. Seward during the Johnson administration first proposed an initial treaty concerning damages done to American merchants by five Confederate warships --- CSS Florida, CSS Alabama, CSS Shenandoah, CSS Lark, and CSS Tallahasse, built by Britons. These damages were collectively known as the Alabama Claims. These ships had inflicted tremendous damage to U.S. shipping, as insurance rates soared, and shippers switched to British ships. Senator Charles Sumner wanted the British to pay heavy damages, perhaps including turning over Canada. Later, the U.S. added the British blockade runners to the claims, stating that they were responsible for prolonging the war by two years by smuggling in weapons through the Union blockade to the Confederacy.

In April 1869, the U.S. Senate overwhelmingly rejected President Johnson's proposed treaty that paid too little and contained no admission of British guilt for prolonging the war. Negotiations for a new treaty began in January 1871 when Britain sent Sir John Rose to America to meet with Fish. A joint high commission was created on February 9, 1871, in Washington, consisting of representatives from both Britain and the United States. The commission created a treaty where an international tribunal would settle the damage amounts; the British admitted regret, not fault, over the destructive actions of the Confederate war cruisers, nor that charges of blockade running were included in the treaty. Grant approved and signed the treaty on May 8, 1871; the Senate ratified the Treaty of Washington on May 24, 1871. The Tribunal met on neutral territory in Geneva, Switzerland. The panel of five international arbitrators included Charles Francis Adams, who was counseled by William M. Evarts, Caleb Cushing, and Morrison R. Waite. On August 25, 1872, the Tribunal awarded the United States $15.5 million in gold; $1.9 million was awarded to Great Britain.

==== Korean Expedition 1871 ====
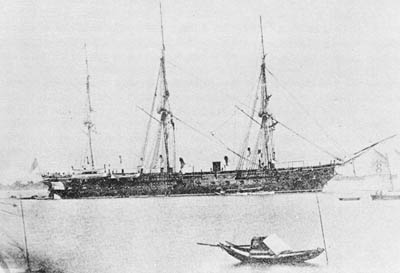
USS Colorado transported troops in Admiral John Rodgers's assault on the Korean forts.

In 1871, the Grant administration sought to open Korea and the United States in a trade agreement. In May 1871, the U.S. Minister to China ordered a squadron of Navy ships to Seoul to pressure the Korean government to sign a trade treaty with the United States, similar to opening up trade with Japan in 1854, by Commodore Matthew Perry. The Koreans resisted and sent a fleet of ships to block the entrance of the Han River to prevent the U.S. Navy from reaching Seoul. On May 30, 1871, Rear Admiral John Rodgers with a fleet of five ships, part of the Asiatic Squadron, arrived at the mouth of the Salee River below Seoul. The Koreans fired on the U.S. ships with little damage done. Rogers demanded an apology from the Koreans and open trade negotiations, but the Koreans refused to comply. On June 10, Rogers attacked and destroyed several Korean forts. This attack was called the Battle of Ganghwa, which resulted in 250 Koreans and three Americans killed. The Koreans still refused to negotiate, and the American fleet sailed away. The Koreans refer to this 1871 U.S. military action as Shinmiyangyo. Grant defended Rogers in his third annual message to Congress in December 1871.

=== Native American policy ===
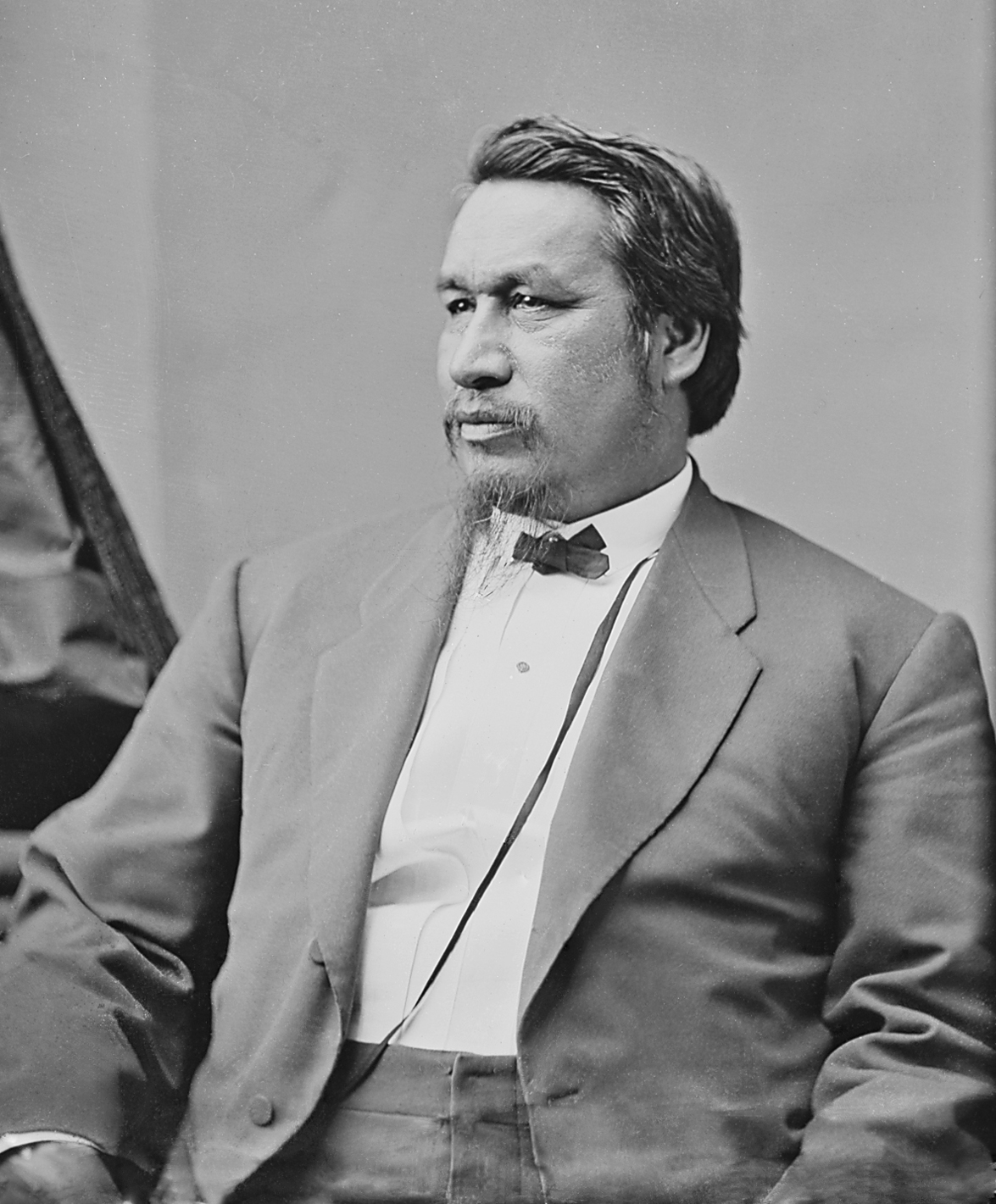
Ely S. Parker Donehogawa

After the very bloody frontier wars in the 1860s, Grant sought to build a "peace policy" toward the tribes. He emphasized appointees who wanted peace and were favorable toward religious groups. In the end, however, the Western warfare grew worse. Grant declared in his 1869 Inaugural Address that he favored "any course toward them which tends to their civilization and ultimate citizenship." In a bold step, Grant appointed his aide General Ely S. Parker, Donehogawa (a Seneca), the first Native American Commissioner of Indian Affairs. Parker met some opposition in the Senate until Attorney General Hoar said Parker was legally able to hold the office. The Senate confirmed Parker by a vote of 36 to 12. During Parker's tenure, Native wars dropped from 101 in 1869 to 58 in 1870.

==== Board of Indian Commissioners ====
Early on, Grant met with tribal chiefs of the Choctaw, Creek, Cherokee, and Chickasaw nations who expressed interest in teaching "wild" Natives outside their own settled districts farming skills. Grant told the Native chiefs that American settlement would lead to inevitable conflict, but that the "march to civilization" would lead to pacification. On April 10, 1869, Congress created the Board of Indian Commissioners. Grant appointed volunteer members who were "eminent for their intelligence and philanthropy." The Grant Board was given extensive joint power with Grant, Secretary of the Interior Cox, and the Interior Department to supervise the Bureau of Indian Affairs and "civilize" Native Americans. No Natives were appointed to the committee, only European Americans. The commission monitored purchases and began to inspect Native agencies. It attributed much of the trouble in Native country to the encroachment of whites. The board approved of the destruction of Native culture. The Natives were to be instructed in Christianity, agriculture, representative government, and assimilated on reservations.

==== Marias Massacre ====
On January 23, 1870, the Peace Policy was tested when Major Edward M. Baker senselessly slaughtered 173 Piegan Indians, mostly women and children, in the Marias Massacre. Public outcry increased when General Sheridan defended Baker's actions. On July 15, 1870, Grant signed Congressional legislation that barred military officers from holding either elected or appointed office or suffering dismissal from the Army. In December 1870, Grant submitted to Congress the names of the new appointees, most of whom were confirmed by the Senate.

==== Red Cloud White House visit ====
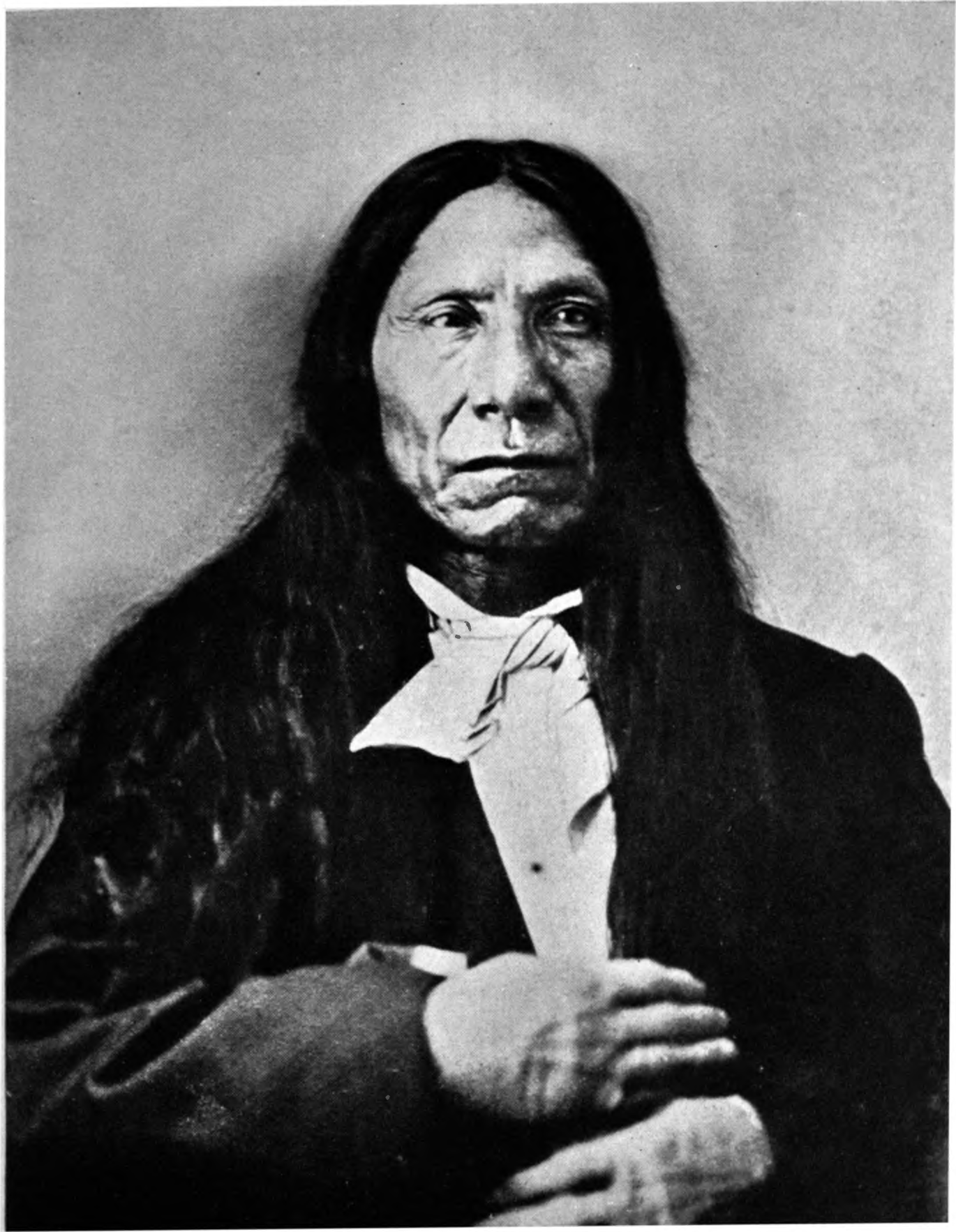
Red Cloud Maȟpíya Lúta

Grant's Peace policy received a boost when the Chief of the Oglala Sioux Red Cloud, Maȟpíya Lúta, and Brulé Sioux Spotted Tail, Siŋté Glešká, arrived in Washington, D.C., and met Grant at the White House for a bountiful state dinner on May 7, 1870. Red Cloud, at a previous meeting with Secretary Cox and Commissioner Parker, complained that promised rations and arms for hunting had not been delivered. Afterward, Grant and Cox lobbied Congress for the promised supplies and rations. Congress responded, and on July 15, 1870, Grant signed the Indian Appropriations Act into law, which appropriated the tribal monies. Two days after Spotted Tail urged the Grant administration to keep white settlers from invading Native reservation land, Grant ordered all Generals in the West to "keep intruders off by military force if necessary". In 1871, Grant signed another Indian Appropriations Act that ended the governmental policy of treating tribes as independent sovereign nations. Natives would be treated as individuals or wards of the state and Indian policies would be legislated by Congressional statutes.

==== Peace policy ====
At the core of the Peace Policy was placing the western reservations under the control of religious denominations. In 1872, the implementation of the policy involved the allotment of Indian reservations to religious organizations as exclusive religious domains. Of the 73 agencies assigned, the Methodists received fourteen; the Orthodox Friends ten; the Presbyterians nine; the Episcopalians eight; the Roman Catholics seven; the Hicksite Friends six; the Baptists five; the Dutch Reformed five; the Congregationalists three; Christians two; Unitarians two; American Board of Commissioners for Foreign Missions one; and Lutherans one. Infighting between competitive missionary groups over the distribution of agencies was detrimental to Grant's Peace Policy. The selection criteria were vague, and some critics saw the Peace Policy as violating Native American freedom of religion. In another setback, William Welsh, a prominent merchant, prosecuted the Bureau in a Congressional investigation over malfeasance. Although Parker was exonerated, legislation was passed in Congress that authorized the board to approve goods and services payments by vouchers from the Bureau. Parker resigned from office, and Grant replaced Parker with reformer Francis A. Walker.

=== Domestic policy ===
Holidays law
On June 28, 1870, Grant approved and signed legislation that made Christmas, on December 25, a legal federal public holiday in the national capital of Washington, D.C. According to historian Ron White, Grant did this because of his passion to unify the nation. During the early 19th Century in the United States, Christmas became more of a family-centered activity. Other federal Holidays, included in the law within Washington, D.C., were New Year, Fourth of July, and Thanksgiving. (Note: The law affected 5,300 federal employees working in the District of Columbia, the nation's capital. The legislation was meant to adapt to similar laws in states surrounding Washington, D.C., and "in every State of the Union.")

Utah territory polygamy

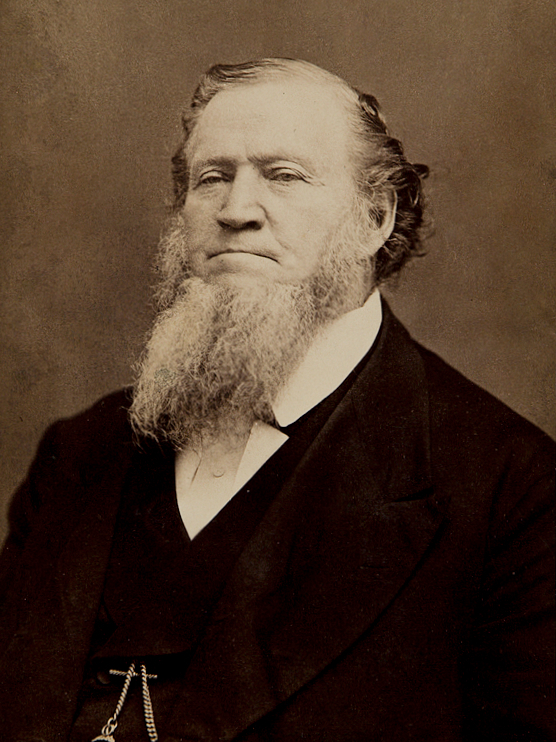
Brigham Young Charles William Carter 1866–1877

In 1862, during the American Civil War, President Lincoln signed the Morrill bill into law, banning polygamy in all U.S. territories. Mormons who practiced polygamy in Utah, for the most part, resisted the Morrill law and the territorial governor. During the 1868 election, Grant had mentioned he would enforce the law against polygamy. Tensions began as early as 1870, when Mormons in Ogden, Utah, began to arm themselves and practice military drilling. By the Fourth of July, 1871, Mormon militia in Salt Lake City, Utah, were on the verge of fighting territorial troops; in the end, violence was averted. Grant, however, who believed Utah was in a state of rebellion was determined to arrest those who practiced polygamy outlawed under the Morrill Act. In October 1871, hundreds of Mormons were rounded up by U.S. marshals, put in a prison camp, arrested, and put on trial for polygamy. One convicted polygamist received a $500 fine and three years in prison under hard labor. On November 20, 1871, Mormon leader Brigham Young, in ill health, had been charged with polygamy. Young's attorney stated that Young had no intention to flee the court. Other persons during the polygamy shutdown were charged with murder or intent to kill. The Morrill Act, however, proved hard to enforce since proof of marriage was required for conviction. (Note: Grant personally found polygamy morally offensive. On December 4, 1871, Grant said polygamists in Utah were "a remnant of barbarism, repugnant to civilization, to decency, and to the laws of the United States.")

Comstock Act

In March 1873, anti-obscenity moralists, led by Anthony Comstock, secretary of the New York Society for the Suppression of Vice, easily secured passage of the Comstock Act, which made it a federal crime to mail articles "for any indecent or immoral use". Grant signed the bill after he was assured that Comstock would personally enforce it. Comstock went on to become a special agent of the Post Office appointed by Secretary James Cresswell. Comstock prosecuted pornographers, imprisoned abortionists, banned nude art, stopped the mailing of information about contraception, and tried to ban what he considered bad books.

Early suffrage movement

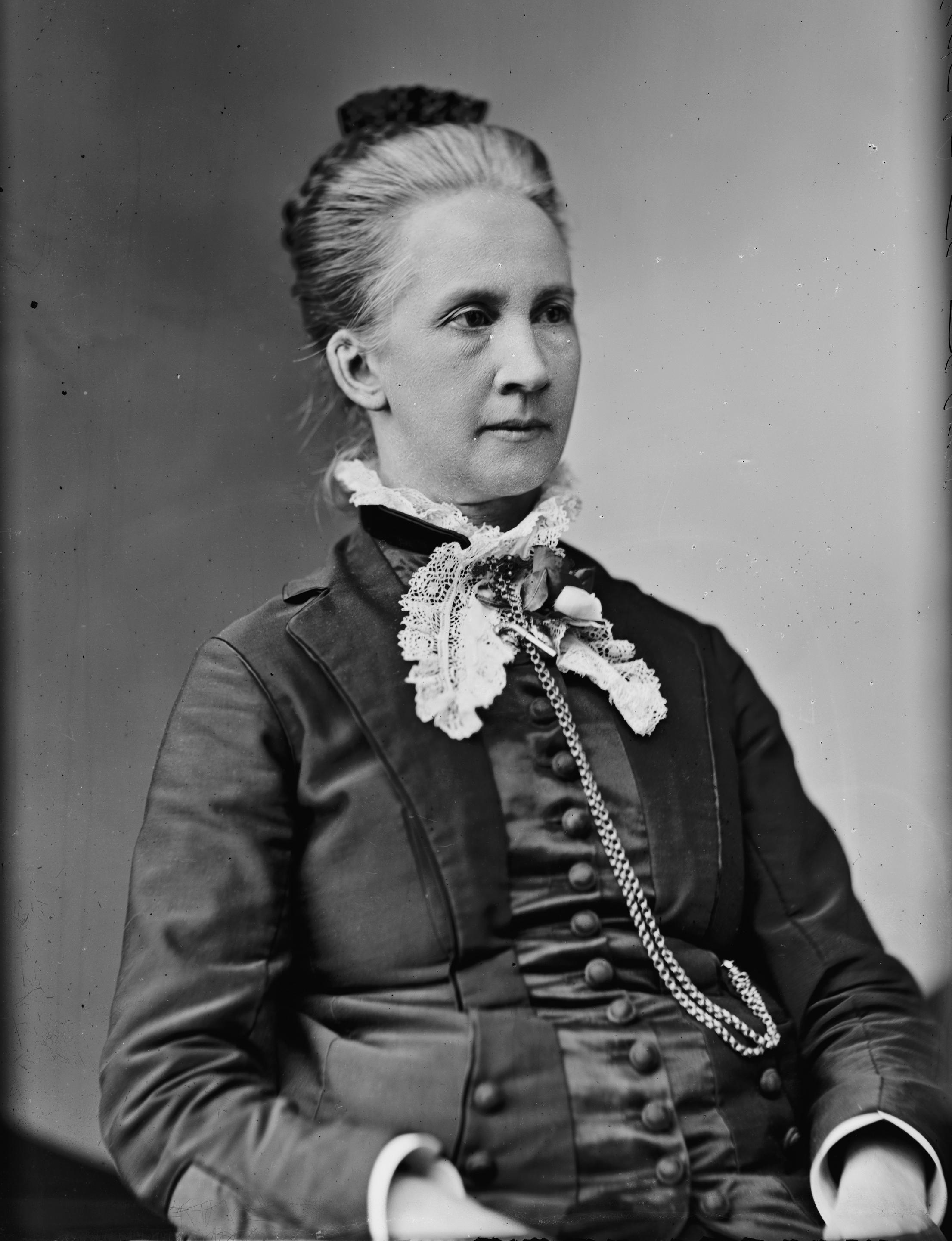
Bennette Lockwood Mathew Brady 1865–1880

During Grant's presidency, the early Women's suffrage movement led by Susan B. Anthony and Elizabeth Cady Stanton gained national attention. Anthony lobbied for female suffrage, equal gender pay, and protection of property for women who resided in Washington, D.C. In April 1869, Grant signed into law the protection of married women's property from their husbands' debts and the ability for women to sue in court in Washington, D.C. In March 1870 Representative Samuel M. Arnell introduced a bill, coauthored by suffragist Bennette Lockwood, that would give women federal workers equal pay for equal work. Two years later, Grant signed a modified Senate version of the Arnell Bill into law. The law required that all federal female clerks would be paid the fully compensated salary; however, lower-tiered female clerks were exempted. The law increased women's clerk salaries from 4% to 20% during the 1870s; however, the culture of patronage and patriarchy continued. To placate the burgeoning suffragist movement, the Republicans' platform included that women's rights should be treated with "respectful consideration", while Grant advocated equal rights for all citizens.

=== Yellowstone and wildlife issues ===
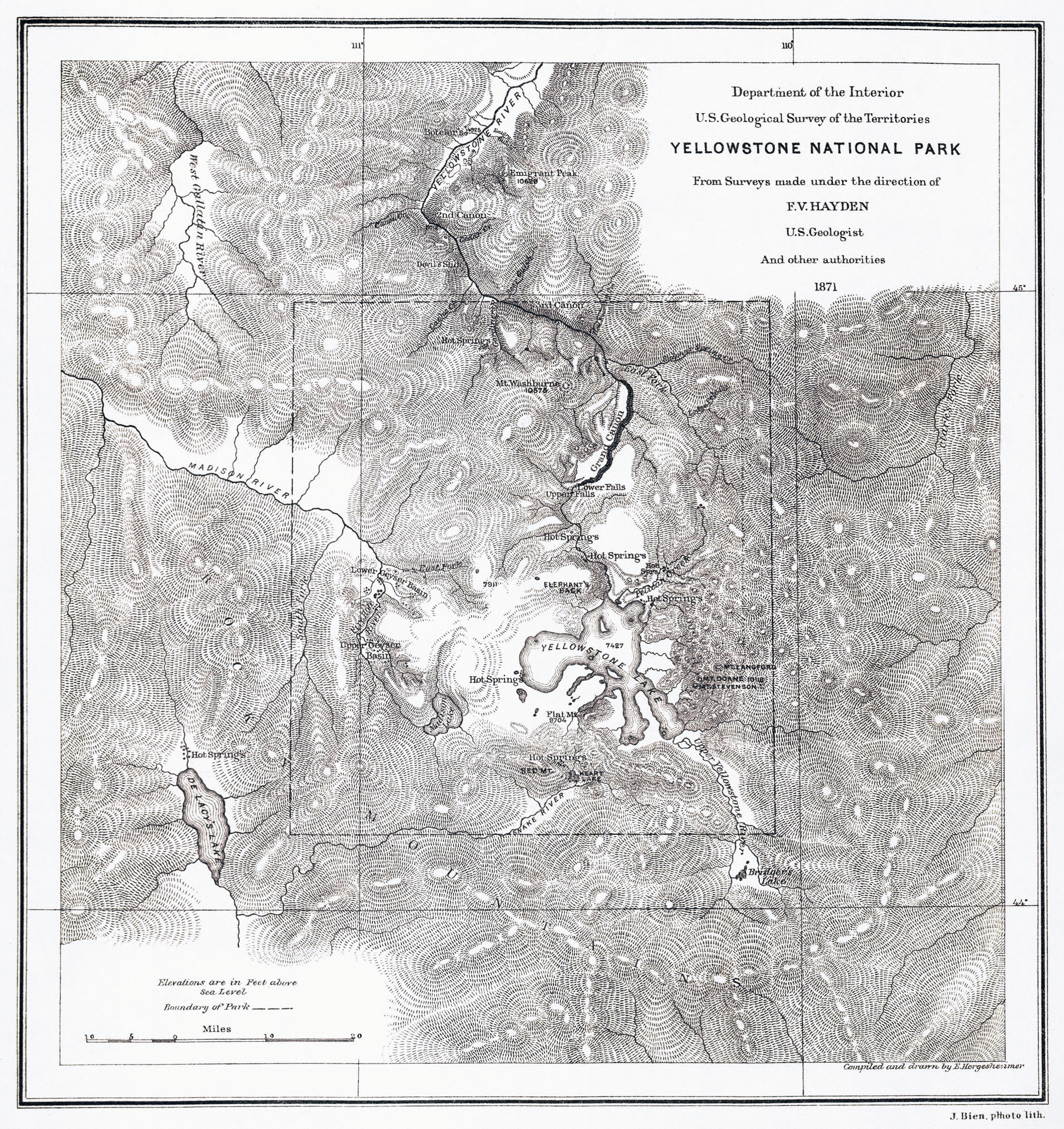
Hayden's Map of Yellowstone, 1871

On March 1, 1872, Grant played his role in signing the "Act of Dedication" into law, which established the Yellowstone region as the nation's first national park. It was made possible by three years of exploration by Cook-Folsom-Peterson (1869), Washburn-Langford-Doane (1870), and Hayden (1871). The 1872 Yellowstone Act prohibited fish and game, including buffalo, from "wanton destruction" within the confines of the park. However, Congress did not appropriate funds or legislation for the enforcement against poaching; as a result, Secretary Delano could not hire people to aid tourists or protect Yellowstone from encroachment. By the 1880s buffalo herds dwindled to only a few hundred, a majority found mostly in Yellowstone National Park. As the Indian wars ended, Congress appropriated money and enforcement legislation in 1894, signed into law by President Grover Cleveland, that protected and preserved buffalo and other wildlife in Yellowstone. Grant also signed legislation that protected northern fur seals on Alaska's Pribilof Islands. This was the first law in U.S. history that specifically protected wildlife on federally owned land.

=== Reforms and scandals ===
==== Civil service commission ====
Grant was the first president to recommend a professional civil service. He pushed the initial legislation through Congress and appointed the members for the first United States Civil Service Commission. The temporary Commission recommended administering competitive exams and issuing regulations on the hiring and promotion of government employees. Grant ordered their recommendations in effect in 1872, having lasted for two years until December 1874. At the New York Custom House, a port that took in hundreds of millions of dollars a year in revenue, applicants for an entry position now had to pass a written civil service examination. Chester A. Arthur, who was appointed by Grant as New York Custom Collector, stated that the examinations excluded and deterred unfit persons from getting employment positions. However, Congress, in no mood to reform itself, denied any long-term reform by refusing to enact the necessary legislation to make the changes permanent. Historians have traditionally been divided on whether patronage, meaning appointments made without a merit system, should be labeled corruption. Grant used patronage to build his party and help his friends. He protected those whom he thought were the victims of injustice or attacks by his enemies, even if they were guilty. Grant believed in loyalty to his friends, as one writer called it the "Chivalry of Friendship".

==== Gold corner conspiracy ====
The New York gold conspiracy almost dismantled Grant's presidency. In September 1869, financial schemers Jay Gould and Jim Fisk set up an elaborate plan to corner the New York gold market, buying up all the gold at the same time to drive up the price. The higher price of gold would increase Eastern exports and the profits of Gould's Erie Railroad. Gould and Fisk had to keep the Government from selling gold, thus driving up its price. Grant and the Secretary of the Treasury George S. Boutwell found out about the gold market speculation and ordered the sale of $4 million in gold on (Black) Friday, September 23. Gould and Fisk were thwarted, and the price of gold dropped. The effects of releasing gold by Boutwell were disastrous. Stock prices plunged and food prices dropped, devastating farmers for years. Although the financial panic that followed was short-lived, the gold scandal overshadowed Grant's presidency.

==== New York Custom House Ring ====
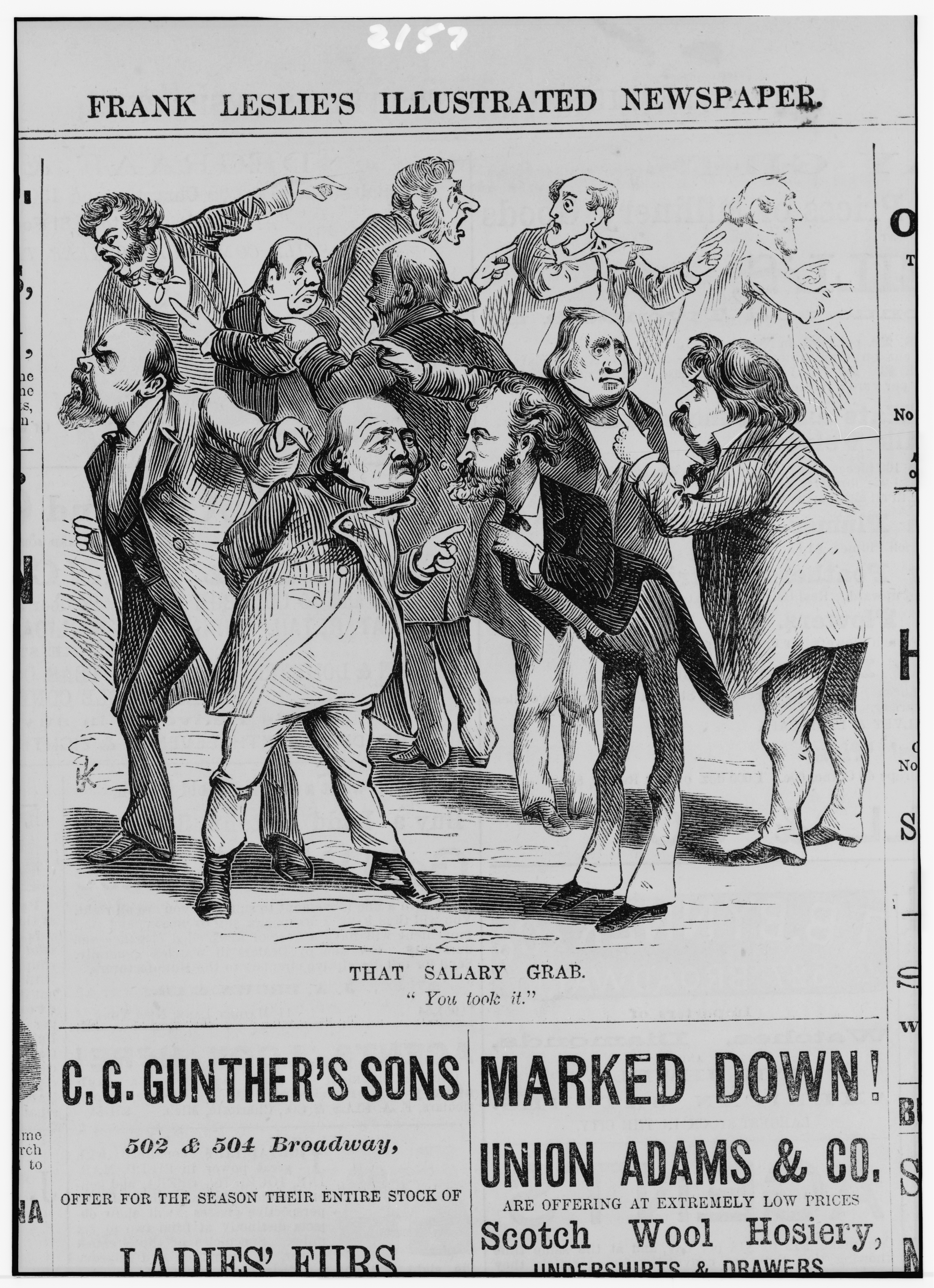
"Salary Grab" caption: "That salary grab – 'You took it'" Frank Leslie's Illustrated Newspaper December 27, 1873

Prior to the presidential election of 1872 two congressional and one Treasury Department investigations took place over corruption at the New York Custom House under Grant collector appointments Moses H. Grinnell and Thomas Murphy. Private warehouses were taking imported goods from the docks and charging shippers storage fees. Grant's friend, George K. Leet, allegedly ran an oppressive customhouse storage business, making excessive profits. Grant's third collector appointment, Chester A. Arthur, implemented Secretary of Treasury George S. Boutwell's reform to keep the goods protected on the docks rather than private storage.

==== Star Route Postal Ring ====
In the early 1870s, during the Grant Administration, lucrative postal route contracts were given to local contractors on the Pacific Coast and Southern regions of the United States. These were known as Star Routes because an asterisk was given on official Post Office documents. These remote routes were hundreds of miles long and went to the most rural parts of the United States by horse and buggy. In obtaining these highly prized postal contracts, an intricate ring of bribery and straw bidding was set up in the Postal Contract office; the ring consisted of contractors, postal clerks, and various intermediary brokers. Straw bidding was at its highest practice while John Creswell, Grant's 1869 appointment, was Postmaster-General. An 1872 federal investigation into the matter exonerated Creswell, but he was censured by the minority House report. A $40,000 bribe to the 42nd Congress by one postal contractor had tainted the results of the investigation. In 1876, another congressional investigation under a Democratic House shut down the postal ring for a few years.

==== Salary law ====
On March 3, 1873, Grant signed a law that authorized the president's salary to be increased from $25,000 a year to $50,000 a year and Congressmen's salaries to be increased by $2,500. Representatives also received a retroactive pay bonus for the previous two years of service. This was done in secret and attached to a general appropriations bill. Reforming newspapers quickly exposed the law and the bonus was repealed in January 1874. Grant missed an opportunity to veto the bill and to make a strong statement for good government.

=== Election of 1872 ===
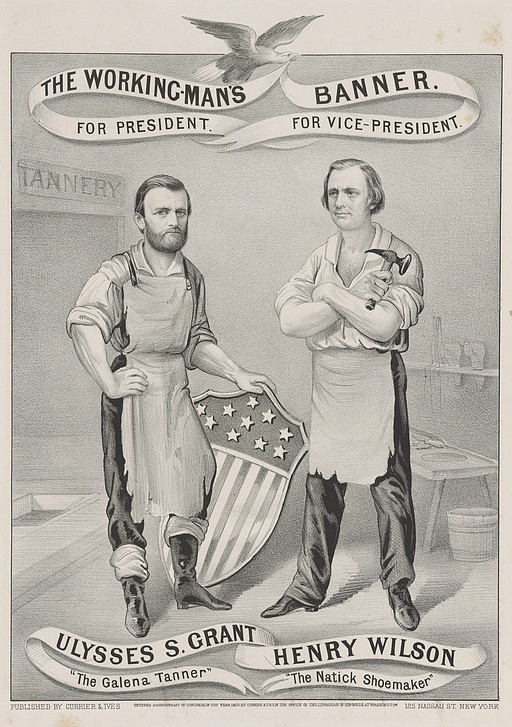
Grant-Wilson Campaign Poster 1872

As his first term entered its final year, Grant remained popular throughout the nation, despite accusations of corruption swirling around his administration. When Republicans gathered for their 1872 national convention, he was unanimously nominated for a second term. Henry Wilson was selected as his running mate over scandal-tainted Vice President Schuyler Colfax. The party platform advocated for high tariffs and the continuation of Radical Reconstruction policies, which supported five military districts in the Southern states.

During Grant's first term, a significant number of Republicans had become completely disillusioned with the party. Weary of the scandals and opposed to several of Grant's policies, they split from the party to form the Liberal Republican Party. At the party's only national convention, held in May 1872 New York Tribune editor Horace Greeley was nominated for president, and Benjamin Gratz Brown was nominated for vice president. They advocated civil service reform, a low tariff, and granting amnesty to former Confederate soldiers. They also wanted to end reconstruction and restore local self-government in the South.

Electoral Vote Results 1872

The Democrats, who at this time had no strong candidate choice of their own, saw an opportunity to consolidate the anti-Grant vote and jumped on the Greeley bandwagon, reluctantly adopting Greeley and Brown as their nominees. It is the only time in American history when a major party endorsed the candidate of a third party. While Grant, like incumbent presidents before him, did not campaign, an efficient party organization composed of thousands of patronage appointees did so on his behalf. Frederick Douglass supported Grant and reminded black voters that Grant had destroyed the violent Ku Klux Klan. Greeley embarked on a five-state campaign tour in late September, during which he delivered nearly 200 speeches. His campaign was plagued by misstatements and embarrassing moments.

However, because of political infighting between Liberal Republicans and Democrats, and due to several campaign blunders, the physically ailing Greeley was no match for Grant, who won in a landslide. Grant won 286 of the 352 Electoral College votes and received 55.6 percent of the popular vote nationwide. The President's reelection victory also brought an overwhelming Republican majority into both houses of Congress. Heartbroken after a hard-fought political campaign, Greeley died a few weeks after the election. Out of respect for Greeley, Grant attended his funeral.

== Second term (1873–1877) ==
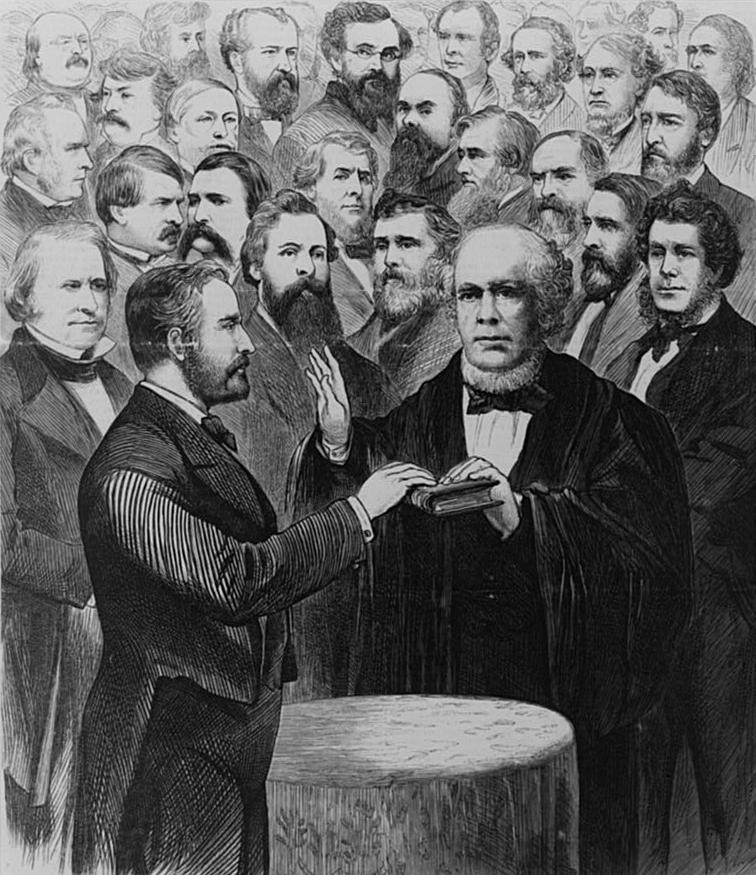
Grant's second inauguration as president by Chief Justice Salmon P. Chase, surrounded by top officials, on March 4, 1873

The second inauguration of Ulysses Grant's presidency was held on Tuesday, March 4, 1873, commencing the second four-year term of his presidency. Departing from the White House, a parade escorted Grant down the newly paved Pennsylvania Avenue, which was all decorated with banners and flags, to the swearing-in ceremony in front of the Capitol building. Chief Justice Salmon P. Chase administered the presidential oath of office. There were approximately 12,000 marchers who participated in the parade, including several units of African American soldiers. At the inaugural ball, there were some 6,000 people in attendance.

Vice President Henry Wilson died in office on November 22, 1875. Senator Thomas Ferry, pro tempore of the Senate, served as "Acting Vice President", and was next in the line of presidential succession.

=== Reconstruction continued ===
Grant was vigorous in his enforcement of the 14th and 15th amendments and prosecuted thousands of persons who violated African American civil rights; he used military force to put down political insurrections in Louisiana, Mississippi, and South Carolina. He proactively used military and Justice Department enforcement of civil rights laws and the protection of African Americans more than any other 19th-century president. He used his full powers to weaken the Ku Klux Klan, reducing violence and intimidation in the South. He appointed James Milton Turner as the first African American minister to a foreign nation. Grant's relationship with Charles Sumner, the leader in promoting civil rights, was shattered by the Senator's opposition to Grant's plan to acquire Santo Domingo by treaty. Grant retaliated, firing men Sumner had recommended and having allies strip Sumner of his chairmanship of the Foreign Relations Committee. Sumner joined the Liberal Republican movement in 1872 to fight Grant's reelection.

Conservative resistance to Republican state governments grew after the 1872 elections. With the destruction of the Klan in 1872, new secret paramilitary organizations arose in the Deep South. In Mississippi, North Carolina, South Carolina, and Louisiana, the Red Shirts and White League operated openly and were better organized than the Ku Klux Klan. Their goals were to oust the Republicans, return Conservative whites to power, and use whatever illegal methods were needed to achieve them. Being loyal to his veterans, Grant remained determined that African Americans would receive protection.

==== Colfax Massacre ====
After the November 4, 1872, election, Louisiana was a split state. In a controversial election, two candidates were claiming victory as governor. Violence was used to intimidate black Republicans. The fusionist party of Liberal Republicans and Democrats claimed John McEnery as the victor, while the Republicans claimed U.S. Senator William P. Kellogg. Two months later, each candidate was sworn in as governor on January 13, 1873. A federal judge ruled that Kellogg was the rightful winner of the election and ordered him and the Republican-based majority to be seated. The White League supported McEnery and prepared to use military force to remove Kellogg from office. Grant ordered troops to enforce the court order and protect Kellogg. On March 4, Federal troops under a flag of truce and Kellogg's state militia defeated McEnery's fusionist party's insurrection.

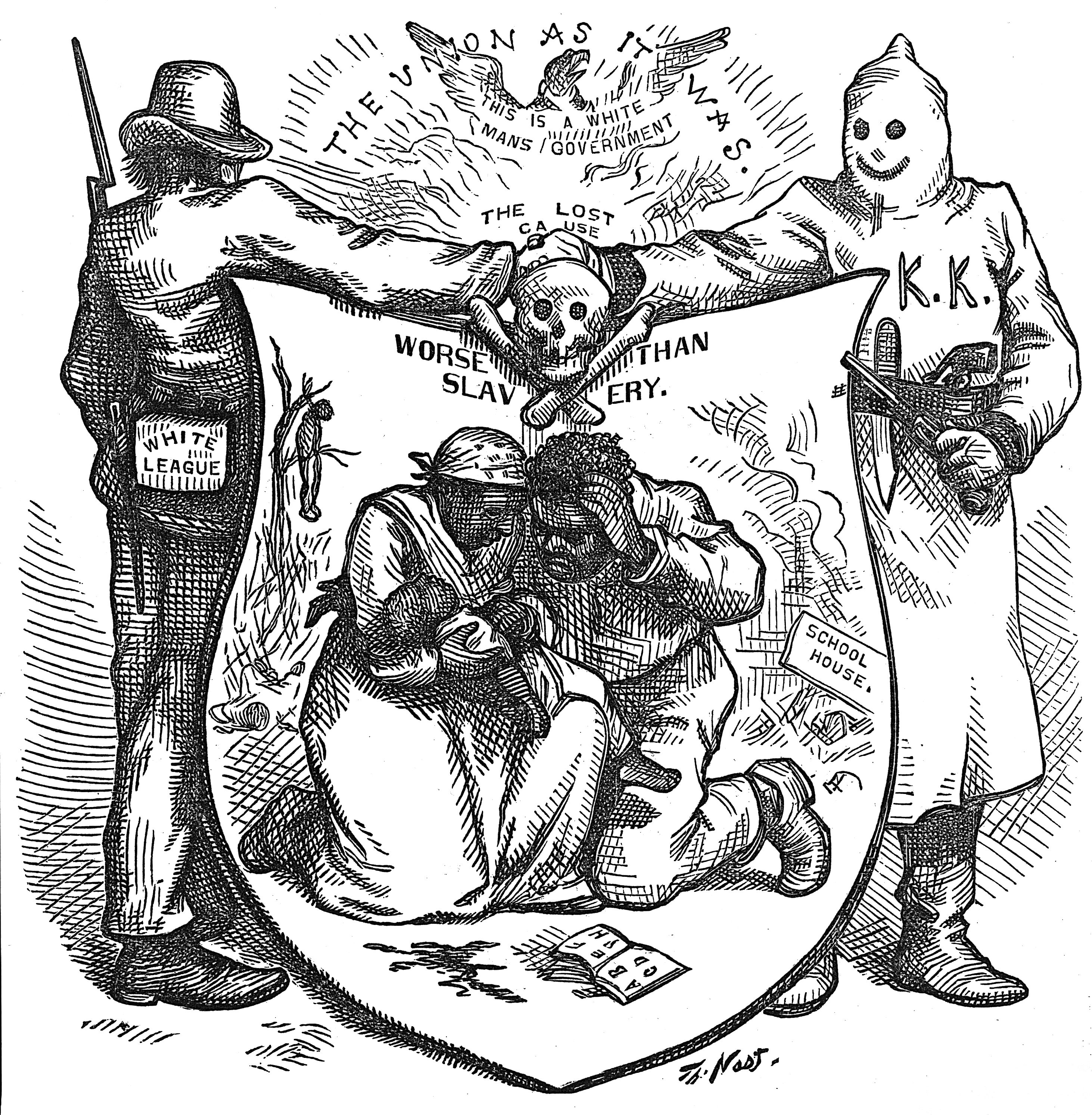
Louisiana White League units in 1874 to terrorized black Republicans

A dispute arose over who would be installed as judge and sheriff at the Colfax courthouse in Grant Parish. Kellogg's two appointees had seized control of the courthouse on March 25 with the aid and protection of black state militia troops. Then, on April 13, White League forces attacked the courthouse and massacred 50 black militiamen who had been captured. A total of 105 blacks were killed trying to defend the Colfax courthouse for Governor Kellogg. On April 21, Grant sent in the U.S. 19th Infantry Regiment to restore order. On May 22, Grant issued a new proclamation to restore order in Louisiana. On May 31, McEnery finally told his followers to obey "peremptory orders" of the President. The orders brought a brief peace to New Orleans and most of Louisiana, except, ironically, Grant Parish.

==== Brooks-Baxter war in Arkansas ====
In the fall of 1872, the Republican party split in Arkansas and ran two candidates for governor, Elisha Baxter and Joseph Brooks. Massive fraud characterized the election, but Baxter was declared the winner and took office. Brooks never gave up; finally, in 1874, a local judge ruled Brooks was entitled to the office and swore him in. Both sides mobilized militia units, and rioting and fighting bloodied the streets. Speculation swirled as to who President Grant would side with – either Baxter or Brooks. Grant delayed, requesting a joint session of the Arkansas government to figure out peacefully who would be the Governor, but Baxter refused to participate. On May 15, 1874, Grant issued a proclamation declaring Baxter the legitimate Governor of Arkansas, and hostilities ceased. In the fall of 1874, the people of Arkansas voted out Baxter, and Republicans and the Redeemers came to power.

A few months later, in early 1875, Grant announced that Brooks had been legitimately elected back in 1872. Grant did not send in troops, and Brooks never regained office. Instead, Grant appointed him to the high-paying patronage job of US postmaster in Little Rock. Grant's legalistic approach did resolve the conflict peacefully, but it left the Republican Party in Arkansas in total disarray and further discredited Grant's reputation.

==== Vicksburg riots ====
In August 1874, the Vicksburg city government elected White reform party candidates consisting of Republicans and Democrats. They promised to lower city spending and taxes. Despite such intentions, the reform movement turned racist when the new White city officials went after the county government, which had a majority of African Americans. The White League threatened the life of and expelled Crosby, the black Warren County Sheriff and tax collector. Crosby sought help from Republican Governor Adelbert Ames to regain his position as sheriff. Governor Ames told him to take other African Americans and use force to retain his lawful position. At that time, Vicksburg had a population of 12,443, more than half of whom were African American. On December 7, 1874, Crosby and an African American militia approached Vicksburg. He had said that the Whites were "ruffians, barbarians, and political banditti". A series of confrontations occurred against white paramilitary forces that resulted in the deaths of 29 African Americans and 2 Whites. The White militia retained control of the County Courthouse and jail.

On December 21, Grant issued a Presidential Proclamation for the people in Vicksburg to stop fighting. General Philip Sheridan, based in Louisiana for this regional territory, dispatched federal troops, who reinstated Crosby as sheriff and restored the peace. When questioned about the matter, Governor Ames denied that he had told Crosby to use the African American militia. On June 7, 1875, Crosby was shot in the head by a white deputy while drinking in a bar. He survived, but never fully recovered from his injuries. The origins of the shooting remained a mystery.

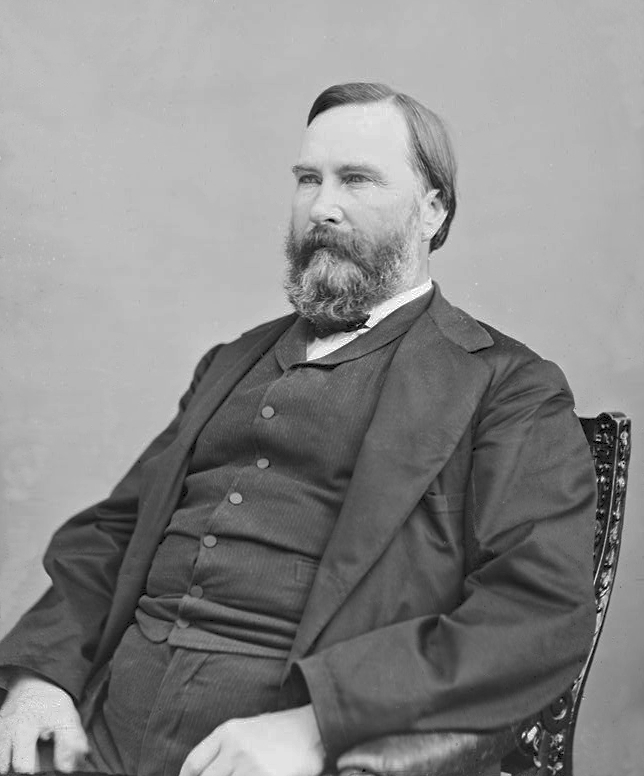
Former Confederate General James A. Longstreet and African American militia attempted to stop a white supremacist revolt at New Orleans in September 1874.

==== Louisiana revolt and coups ====
On September 14, 1874, the White League and Democratic militia took control of the state house at New Orleans, and the Republican Governor William P. Kellogg was forced to flee. Former Confederate General James A. Longstreet, with 3,000 African American militia and 400 Metropolitan police, made a counterattack on the 8,000 White League troops. Consisting of former Confederate soldiers, the experienced White League troops routed Longstreet's army. On September 17, Grant sent in Federal troops, and they restored the government to Kellogg. During the following controversial election in November, passions rose high, and violence mixed with fraud was rampant; the state of affairs in New Orleans was becoming out of control. The results were that 53 Republicans and 53 Democrats were elected, with 5 remaining seats to be decided by the legislature.

Grant had been careful to watch the elections and secretly sent Phil Sheridan in to keep law and order in the state. Sheridan had arrived in New Orleans a few days before the January 4, 1875, legislature opening meeting. At the convention, the Democrats, again with military force, took control of the state building out of Republican hands. Initially, the Democrats were protected by federal troops under Colonel Régis de Trobriand, and the escaped Republicans were removed from the hallways of the state building. However, Governor Kellogg then requested that Trobriand reseat the Republicans. Trobriand returned to the Statehouse and used bayonets to force the Democrats out of the building. The Republicans then organized their own house with their own speakers, all being protected by the Federal Army. Sheridan, who had annexed the Department of the Gulf to his command at 9:00 p.m., claimed that the federal troops were neutral since they had also protected the Democrats earlier.

==== Civil Rights Act of 1875 ====
In early 1875, with Grant's support, Congress took up one last measure to ensure Civil Rights for black people, particularly in the South. (Note: Throughout his presidency, Grant was continually concerned with the civil rights of all Americans, "irrespective of nationality, color, or religion.") Grant quickly signed the bill into law. The new law was designed to allow everyone access to public eating establishments, hotels, and places of entertainment. This was done particularly to protect African Americans who were discriminated against across the United States. The bill was also passed in honor of Senator Charles Sumner. In his sixth message to Congress, Grant summed up his own views, "While I remain Executive all the laws of Congress and the provisions of the Constitution ... will be enforced with rigor .... Treat the Negro as a citizen and a voter, as he is and must remain .... Then we shall have no complaint of sectional interference." The law, however, proved ineffective for blacks from the start, as it was largely ignored and difficult to enforce. In 1883, the Supreme Court, ruled the law was unconstitutional.

==== South Carolina 1876 ====
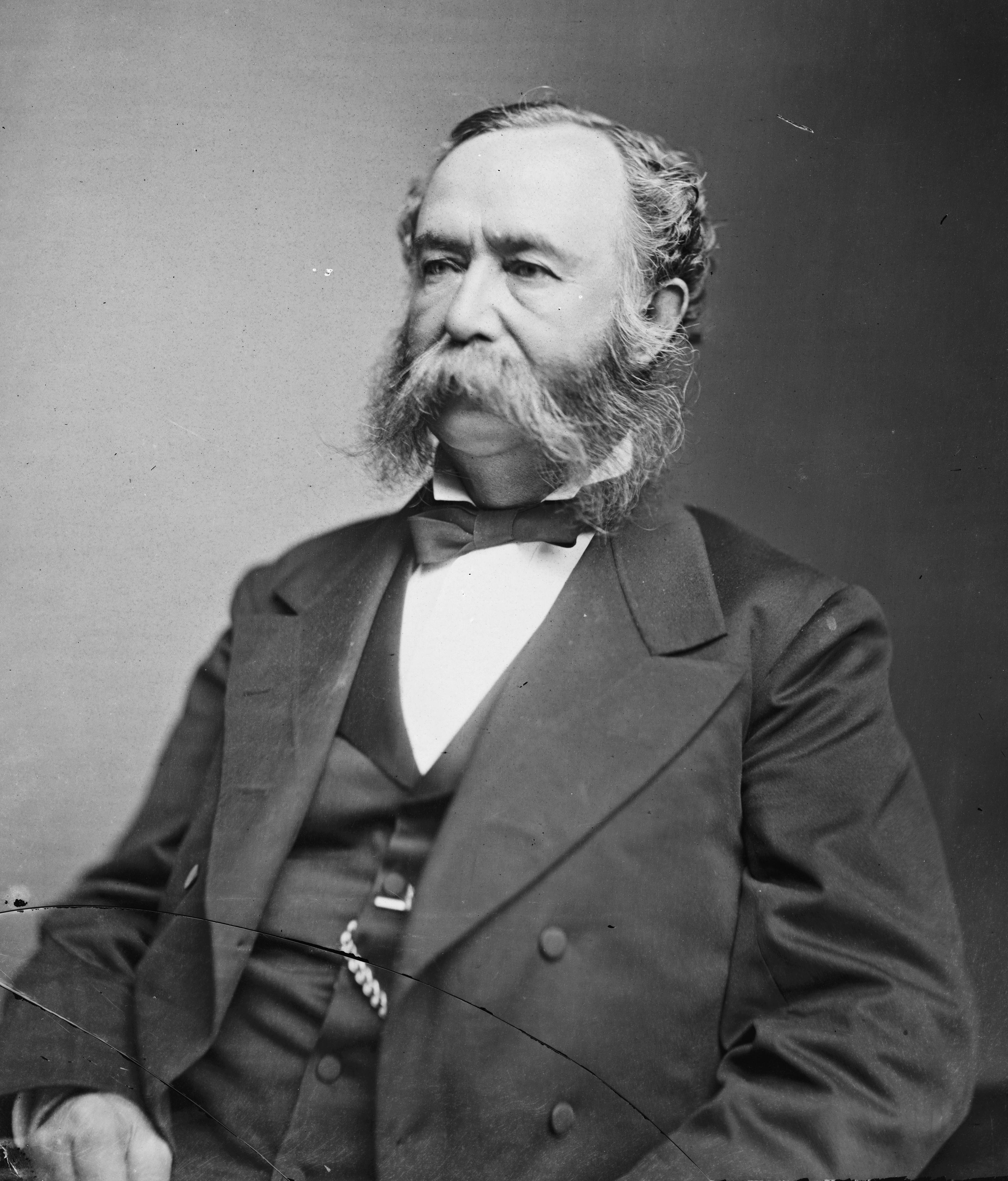
Former Confederate officer Wade Hampton III was supported by the terrorist group Red Shirts in the 1876 Governor's election in South Carolina.

During the election year of 1876, South Carolina was in a state of rebellion against Republican governor Daniel H. Chamberlain. Conservatives were determined to win the election for ex-Confederate Wade Hampton through violence and intimidation. The Republicans went on to nominate Chamberlain for a second term. Hampton supporters, donning red shirts, disrupted Republican meetings with gunshots and yelling. Tensions became violent on July 8, 1876, when five African Americans were murdered at Hamburg. The rifle clubs, wearing their Red Shirts, were better armed than the blacks. South Carolina was ruled more by "mobocracy and bloodshed" than by Chamberlain's government.

Black militia fought back in Charleston on September 6, 1876, in what was known as the "King Street riot". The white militia assumed defensive positions out of concern over possible intervention from federal troops. Then, on September 19, the Red Shirts took offensive action by openly killing between 30 and 50 African Americans outside Ellenton. During the massacre, state representative Simon Coker was killed. On October 7, Governor Chamberlain declared martial law and told all the "rifle club" members to put down their weapons. In the meantime, Wade Hampton never ceased to remind Chamberlain that he did not rule South Carolina. Out of desperation, Chamberlain wrote to Grant and asked for federal intervention. The "Cainhoy riot" took place on October 15 when Republicans held a rally at "Brick Church" outside Cainhoy. Blacks and whites both opened fire; six whites and one black were killed. Grant, upset over the Ellenton and Cainhoy riots, finally declared a Presidential Proclamation on October 17, 1876, and ordered all persons, within 3 days, to cease their lawless activities and disperse to their homes. A total of 1,144 federal infantrymen were sent into South Carolina, and the violence stopped; election day was quiet. Both Hampton and Chamberlain claimed victory, and for a while, both acted as governor; Hampton took the office in 1877 after President Rutherford B. Hayes withdrew federal troops and after Chamberlain left the state.

=== Financial policy ===
==== Panic of 1873 ====
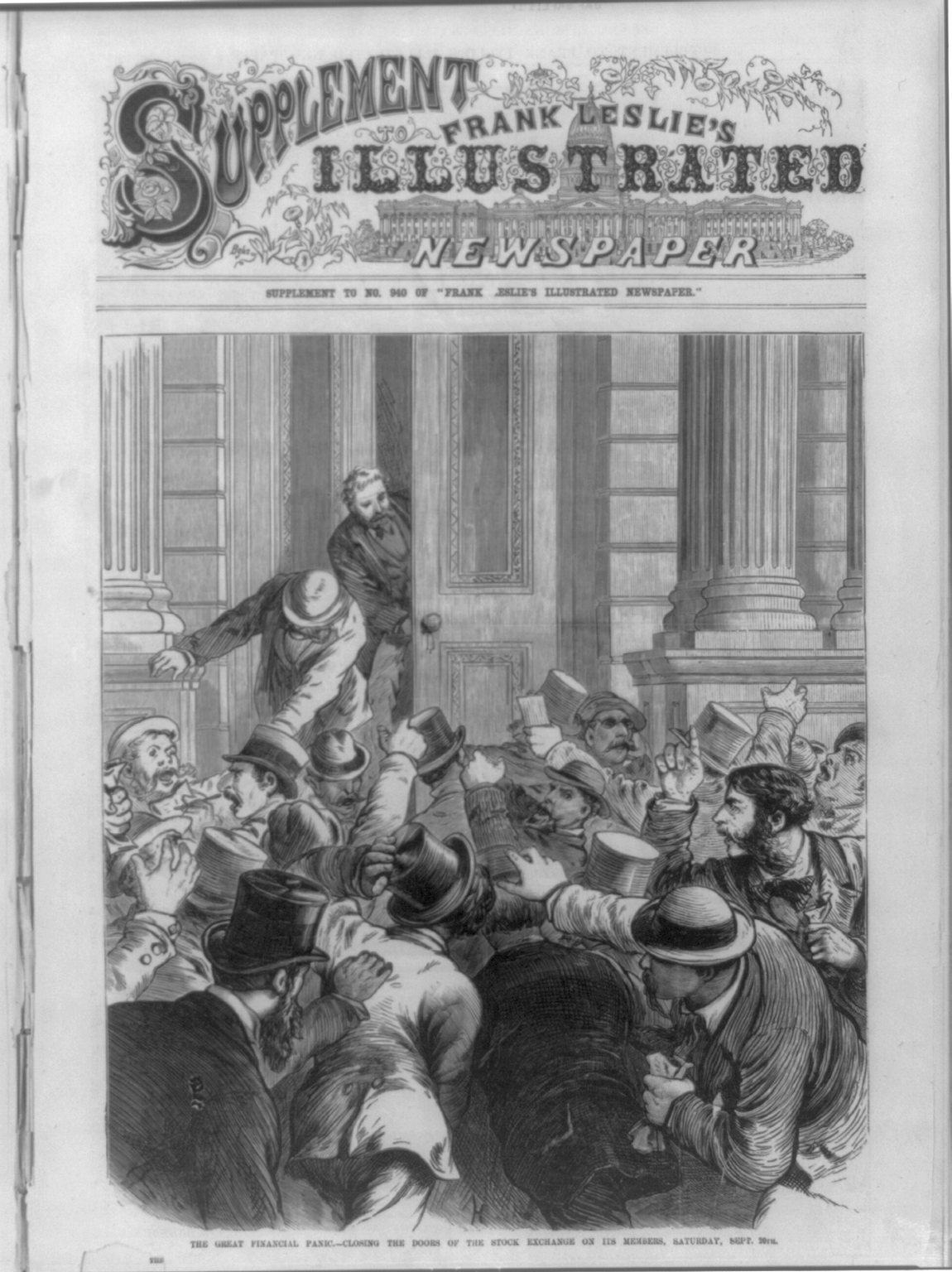
The NYSE closed on September 20, 1873

Between 1868 and 1873, the American economy was robust, primarily caused by railroad building, manufacturing expansion, and thriving agricultural production. Financial debt, however, particularly in railroad investment, spread throughout both the private and federal sectors. The market began to break in July 1873 when the Brooklyn Trust Company went broke and closed. Secretary Richardson sold gold to pay for $14 million in federal bonds. Two months later, the Panic of 1873, collapsed the national economy. On September 17, the stock market crashed, followed by the New York Warehouse & Security Company, September 18, and the Jay Cooke & Company, September 19, both going bankrupt. On September 19, Grant ordered Secretary Richardson, Boutwell's replacement, to purchase $10 million in bonds. Richardson complied by using greenbacks to expand the money supply. On September 20, the New York Stock Exchange (NYSE) closed for ten days. Traveling to New York, Grant met with Richardson to consult with bankers, who gave Grant conflicting financial advice.

Returning to Washington, Grant and Richardson sent millions of greenbacks from the treasury to New York to purchase bonds, stopping the purchases on September 24. By the beginning of January 1874, Richardson had issued a total of $26 million greenbacks from the Treasury reserve into the economy, relieving Wall Street, but not stopping the national Long Depression, which would last 5 years. Thousands of businesses, depressed daily wages by 25% for three years, and brought the unemployment rate up to 14%.

==== Inflation bill vetoed and compromise ====
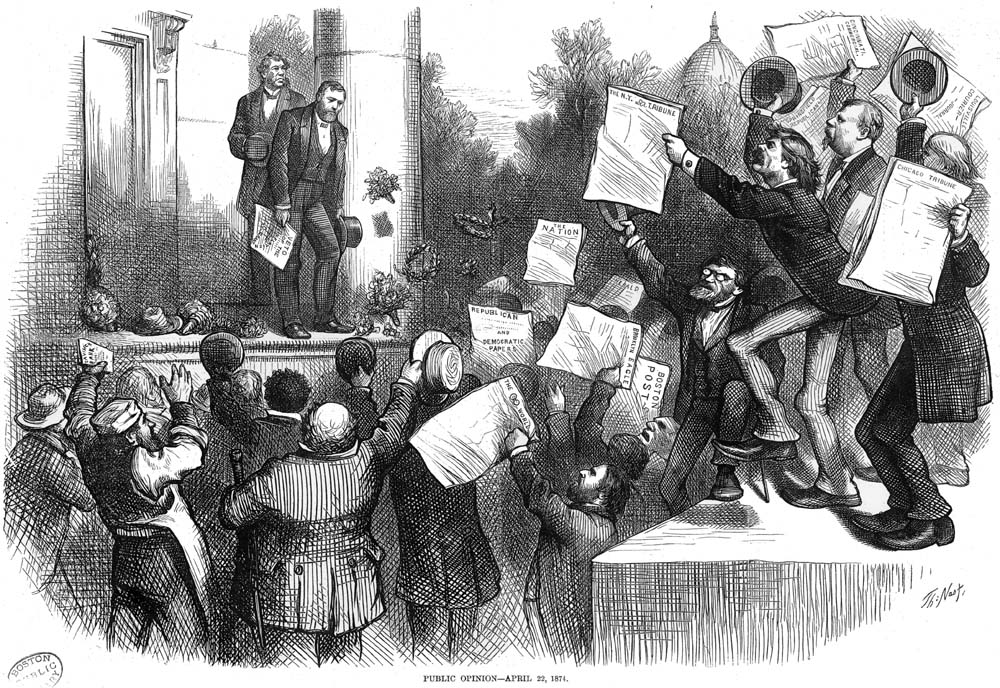
Political cartoon by Thomas Nast: Grant congratulated for vetoing the "inflation bill" on April 22, 1874

Grant and Richardson's mildly inflationary response to the Panic of 1873, encouraged Congress to pursue a more aggressive policy. The legality of releasing greenbacks was presumed to have been illegal. On April 14, 1874, Congress passed the Inflation Bill that set the greenback maximum at $400,000 retroactively legalizing the $26 million reserve greenbacks earlier released by the Treasury. The bill released an additional $18 million in greenbacks up to the original $400,000,000 amount. Going further, the bill authorized an additional $46 million in banknotes and raised their maximum to $400 million. Eastern bankers vigorously lobbied Grant to veto the bill because of their reliance on bonds and foreign investors who did business in gold. Most of Grant's cabinet favored the bill in order to secure a Republican election. Grant's conservative Secretary of State Hamilton Fish threatened to resign if Grant signed the bill. On April 22, 1874, after evaluating his own reasons for wanting to sign the bill, Grant unexpectedly vetoed the bill against the popular election strategy of the Republican Party because he believed it would destroy the nation's credit.

Congress passed a compromise bill, that Grant signed on June 20, 1874. The act legalized the $26 million released by Richardson and set the maximum of greenbacks at $382 million. Up to $55 million in national banknotes would be redistributed from states with an excess to those states that had minimal amounts. The act did little to relieve the national economy

==== Resumption of Specie Act ====
On January 14, 1875, Grant signed the Resumption of Specie Act, and he could not have been happier; he wrote a note to Congress congratulating members on the passage of the act. The legislation was drafted by Ohio Republican Senator John Sherman. This act provided that paper money in circulation would be exchanged for gold specie and silver coins and would be effective January 1, 1879. The act also implemented that gradual steps would be taken to reduce the number of greenbacks in circulation. At that time, there was "paper coin" currency worth less than $1.00, and these would be exchanged for silver coins. Its effect was to stabilize the currency and make the consumer's money as "good as gold". In an age without a Federal Reserve system to control inflation, this act stabilized the economy. Grant considered it the hallmark of his administration.

=== Foreign policy ===
Foreign affairs were managed peacefully during Grant's second term in office. Historians credit Secretary of State Hamilton Fish with a highly effective foreign policy. Ronald Cedric White says of Grant, "everyone agreed he chose well when he appointed Hamilton Fish secretary of state."

==== Virginus incident ====
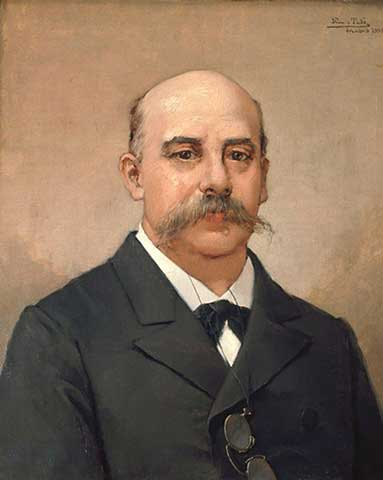
Emilio Castelar Spanish Republic president (1873–1874)

On October 31, 1873, a steamer Virginius, flying the American flag, carrying war materials and men to aid the Cuban insurrection (in violation of American and Spanish law), was intercepted and taken to Cuba. After a hasty trial, the local Spanish officials executed 53 would-be insurgents, eight of whom were United States citizens; orders from Madrid to delay the executions arrived too late. War scares erupted in both the U.S. and Spain, heightened by the bellicose dispatches from the American minister in Madrid, retired general Daniel Sickles. Secretary of State Fish kept a cool demeanor in the crisis, and through investigation discovered there was a question over whether the Virginius ship had the right to bear the United States flag. The Spanish Republic's president Emilio Castelar expressed profound regret for the tragedy and was willing to make reparations through arbitration. Fish negotiated reparations with the Spanish minister Senor Polo de Barnabé. With Grant's approval, Spain was to surrender Virginius, pay an indemnity to the surviving families of the Americans executed, and salute the American flag; the episode ended quietly.

Grant also played a pivotal role in the affair. Grant sent American warships off of Florida and discussed Cuban invasion plans with General Sherman and the War Department. The bluff worked, and the Spanish government accepted Grant's negotiated peace terms. Grant messaged Congress that the incident was closed and national honor was restored. However, the salute of the American flag by the Spanish Navy was a stickler. When the Spanish returned the Virginus the Spanish Navy did not salute the American flag, disputing that the Virginius was not an American-owned ship. The next day, Grant's Attorney General George H. Williams ruled that the Virginus U.S. ownership was fraudulent, but the Spanish had no right to capture the ship.

==== Hawaiian free trade treaty ====
In December 1874, Grant held a state dinner at the White House for the King of Hawaii, David Kalakaua, who was seeking the importation of Hawaiian sugar duty-free to the United States. Grant and Fish were able to produce a successful free trade treaty in 1875 with the Kingdom of Hawaii, incorporating the Pacific islands' sugar industry into the United States's economic sphere.

==== Liberian-Grebo war ====
The U.S. settled the war between Liberia and the native Grebo people in 1876 by dispatching the USS Alaska to Liberia. James Milton Turner, the first African American ambassador from the United States, requested that a warship be sent to protect American property in Liberia, a former American colony. After Alaska arrived, Turner negotiated the incorporation of the Grebo people into Liberian society and the ousting of foreign traders from Liberia.

==== Mexican border raids ====
At the close of Grant's second term in office, Fish had to contend with Indian raids on the Mexican border, due to a lack of law enforcement over the U.S.–Mexican border. The problem would escalate during the Hayes administration, under Fish's successor William Evarts.

=== Native American policy ===
Under Grant's Peace policy, wars between settlers, the federal army, and the American Indians had been decreasing from 101 per year in 1869 to a low of 15 per year in 1875. However, the discovery of gold in the Black Hills of the Dakota Territory and the completion of the Northern Pacific Railway threatened to unravel Grant's Indian policy, as white settlers encroached upon native land to mine for gold. In 1874, Grant issued an executive order that shrank the size of the reservations of the Blackfeet, Gros Ventre, Sioux, and Assiniboine, in response to ranchers' demands for more land. In his second term of presidential office, Grant's fragile Peace policy came apart. Major General Edward Canby was killed in the Modoc War. Indian wars per year jumped up to 32 in 1876 and remained at 43 in 1877. One of the highest casualty Indian battles that took place in American history was at the Battle of Little Bighorn in 1876. Indian war casualties in Montana went from 5 in 1875, to 613 in 1876, and 436 in 1877.

==== Modoc War ====
In January 1873, Grant's Native American peace policy was challenged. Two weeks after Grant was elected for a second term, fighting broke out between the Modocs and settlers near the California-Oregon border. The Modocs, led by Captain Jack, killed 18 white settlers and then found a strong defensive position. Grant ordered General Sherman not to attack the Indians but to settle matters peacefully with a commission. Sherman then sent Major General Edward Canby, but Captain Jack killed him. Reverend Eleazar Thomas, a Methodist minister, was also killed. Alfred B. Meacham, an Indian Agent, was severely wounded. The murders shocked the nation, and Sherman wired to have the Modocs exterminated. Grant overruled Sherman; Captain Jack was executed, and the remaining 155 Modocs were relocated to the Quapaw Agency in the Indian Territory. This episode and the Great Sioux War undermined public confidence in Grant's peace policy, according to historian Robert M. Utley. During the peace negotiations between Brig. Gen. Edward Canby and the Modoc tribal leaders, there were more Indians in the tent than had been agreed upon. As the Indians grew more hostile, Captain Jack said, "I talk no more," and shouted, "All ready." Captain Jack drew his revolver and fired directly into the head of Gen Canby. Brig. Gen Canby was the highest-ranking officer to be killed during the Indian Wars that took place from 1850 to 1890. Alfred Meacham, who survived the massacre, defended the Modocs who were put on trial.

==== Red River War ====
In 1874, war erupted on the southern Plains when Quanah Parker, leader of the Comanche, led 700 tribal warriors and attacked the buffalo hunter supply base on the Canadian River, at Adobe Walls, Texas. The Army under General Phil Sheridan launched a military campaign, and, with few casualties on either side, forced the Indians back to their reservations by destroying their horses and winter food supplies. Grant, who agreed to the Army plan advocated by Generals William T. Sherman and Phil Sheridan, imprisoned 74 insurgents in Florida.

==== Great Sioux War ====
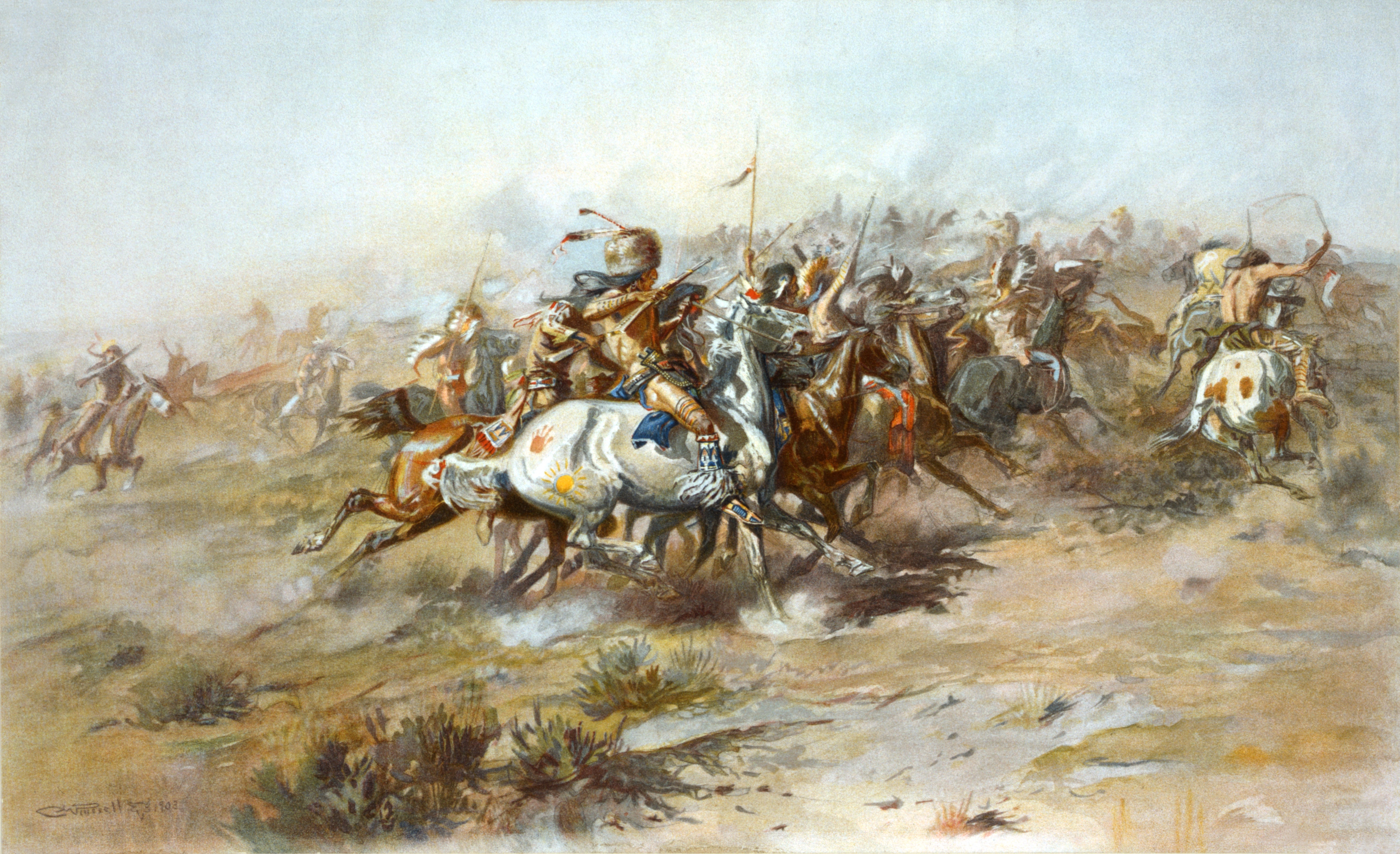
Battle of Little Big Horn Charles Marion Russell 1903

In 1874, gold had been discovered in the Black Hills in the Dakota Territory. White speculators and settlers rushed in droves seeking riches, mining gold on land reserved for the Sioux tribe by the Treaty of Fort Laramie of 1868. These prospectors treated the natives unfairly when they moved into the area. In 1875, to avoid conflict, Grant met with Red Cloud, chief of the Sioux, and offered $25,000 from the government to purchase the land. The offer was declined. On November 3, 1875, at a White House meeting, Phil Sheridan told the President that the Army was overstretched and could not defend the Sioux tribe from the settlers; Grant ordered Sheridan to round up the Sioux and put them on the reservation. Sheridan used a strategy of convergence, using Army columns to force the Sioux onto the reservation. On June 25, 1876, one of these columns, led by Colonel George A. Custer, met the Sioux at the Battle of Little Big Horn and part of his command was slaughtered. Approximately 253 federal soldiers and civilians were killed compared to 40 Indians.

Custer's death and the Battle of Little Big Horn shocked the nation. Sheridan avenged Custer, pacified the northern Plains, and put the defeated Sioux on the reservation. On August 15, 1876, President Grant signed a proviso giving the Sioux nation $1,000,000 in rations, while the Sioux relinquished all rights to the Black Hills, except for a 40-mile land tract west of the 103rd meridian. On August 28, a seven-man committee appointed by Grant gave additional harsh stipulations for the Sioux to receive government assistance. Halfbreeds and "squaw men" (A white man with an Indian wife) were banished from the Sioux reservation. To receive the government rations, the Indians had to work the land. Reluctantly, on September 20, the Indian leaders, whose people were starving, agreed to the committee's demands and signed the agreement.

During the Great Sioux War, Grant came into conflict with Col. George Armstrong Custer after he testified in 1876 about corruption in the War Department under Secretary William W. Belknap (see below). Grant had Custer arrested for breach of military protocol in Chicago and barred him from leading an upcoming campaign against the Sioux. Grant finally relented and let Custer fight under Brig. Gen. Alfred Terry. Two months after Custer's death, Grant publicly blamed Custer for the disaster, saying, "I regard Custer's massacre as a sacrifice of troops, brought on by Custer himself, that was wholly unnecessary – wholly unnecessary." As the nation was shocked by the death of Custer, Grant's peace policy became militaristic; Congress appropriated funds for 2,500 more troops, two more forts were constructed, the army took over the Indian agencies, and Indians were barred from purchasing rifles and ammunition.

=== Domestic policy ===
==== Religion and schools ====
Grant believed strongly in the separation of church and state and championed complete secularization in public schools. In a September 1875 speech, Grant advocated "security of free thought, free speech, and free press, pure morals, unfettered religious sentiments, and of equal rights and privileges to all men, irrespective of nationality, color, or religion." In regard to public education, Grant endorsed that every child should receive "the opportunity of a good common school education, unmixed with sectarian, pagan, or atheist tenets. Leave the matter of religion to the family altar, the church, and the private schools .... Keep the church and the state forever separate." In a speech in 1875 to a veteran's meeting, Grant called for a Constitutional amendment that would mandate free public schools and prohibit the use of public money for sectarian schools. He was echoing nativist sentiments that were strong in his Republican Party. (Note: Tyler Anbinder says, "Grant was not an obsessive nativist. He expressed his resentment of immigrants and animus toward Catholicism only rarely. But these sentiments reveal themselves frequently enough in his writings and major actions as general....In the 1850s he joined a Know Nothing lodge and irrationally blamed immigrants for setbacks in his career.")

Grant laid out his agenda for "good common school education". He attacked government support for "sectarian schools" run by religious organizations and called for the defense of public education "unmixed with sectarian, pagan or atheistical dogmas." Grant declared that "Church and State" should be "forever separate." Religion, he said, should be left to families, churches, and private schools devoid of public funds. After Grant's speech Republican Congressman James G. Blaine proposed the amendment to the federal Constitution. Blaine believed that possibility of hurtful agitation on the school question should be ended. In 1875, the proposed amendment passed by a vote of 180 to 7 in the House of Representatives, but failed by four votes to achieve the necessary two-thirds vote in the Senate. Nothing like it ever became federal legislation. However, many states did adopt similar amendments to their state constitution.

==== Polygamy and Chinese prostitution ====
In October 1875, Grant traveled to Utah and was surprised that the Mormons treated him kindly. He told the Utah territorial governor, George W. Emery, that he had been deceived concerning the Mormons. However, on December 7, 1875, after his return to Washington, Grant wrote to Congress in his seventh annual State of the Union address that as "an institution polygamy should be banished from the land". Grant believed that polygamy negatively affected children and women. Grant advocated that a second law, stronger than the Morrill Act, be passed to "punish so flagrant a crime against decency and morality." Grant also denounced the immigration of Chinese women into the United States for the purposes of prostitution, saying that it was "no less an evil" than polygamy.

==== Interactions with Jews ====
Grant publicly stated regret for his offensive wartime order expelling Jewish traders. In his army days, he traded at a local store operated by the Seligman brothers, two Jewish merchants who became Grant's lifelong friends. They became wealthy bankers who donated substantially to Grant's presidential campaign. After the wartime order, however, the Jewish community was angry with Grant. While running for president, in 1868, Grant publicly apologized for the expulsion order, and once elected, he took actions intended to make amends. He appointed several Jewish leaders to office, including Simon Wolf recorder of deeds in Washington, D.C., and Edward S. Salomon Governor of the Washington Territory.

=== Midterm election 1874 ===
As the 1874 midterm elections approached, three scandals, the Crédit Mobilier, the Salary Grab, and the Sanborn incident caused the public to view the Republican Party as mired in corruption. The Democratic Party held the Republican Party responsible for the Long Depression. The Republicans were divided on the currency issue. Grant, who with hard money Northeastern Republicans, vetoed an inflation bill. Grant was blamed for the nation's problems, while he was accused of wanting a third term. Grant never officially campaigned, but traveled West, to emphasize his relatively popular Indian policy.

The October elections swept the Republicans from office and was a reputation of Grant's veto. In Indiana and Ohio, the Republicans suffered losses, caused by the money issue and the temperance movement. The Democratic Party won the New York governorship for Samuel Tilden. The Democrats won the U.S. House, gaining 182 seats, while the Republicans retained 103 seats. The Republicans retained control of the Senate, but the new class included 14 Democrats and 11 Republicans. The Democratic Party also had strong victories in New Jersey, Massachusetts, Pennsylvania, Missouri, and Illinois.

In the South, the 1874 election campaign was violent. Six Republican office holders were murdered in Coushatta, Louisiana. On September 14, General Longstreet, police, and black militia fought 3,500 White Leaguers who attempted to capture the statehouse in New Orleans, that ended with 32 people killed. Grant issued a dispersal proclamation, the next day, and sent 5,000 troops and 5 gunboats to New Orleans. The White League resistance collapsed. The North disapproved of Grant's federal intervention into the election. Republican representation dropped by 60 percent. Racism in both the North and South caused the rejection of Reconstruction. In his December 1874 annual message to Congress, Grant condemned violence against blacks in the South.

=== Reforms and scandals ===
Scandals and frauds continued to be exposed during Grant's second term in office, although Grant's appointments of reformers to his cabinet temporarily helped his presidential reputation, cleaned up federal departments, and defeated the notorious Whiskey Ring. Grant, however, often remained loyal to cabinet members or appointees involved in corruption or mismanagement, refusing to believe in their guilt. The Democrats along with the Liberal Republicans had gained control of the House of Representatives and held many Committee meetings to stop political graft. The Emma Silver mine was a minor embarrassment associated with American Ambassador to Britain, Robert C. Schenck, using his name to promote a worked out silver mine. The Crédit Mobilier scandal's origins were during the presidential Administrations of Abraham Lincoln and Andrew Johnson; however, political congressional infighting during the Grant Administration exposed the scandal.

==== Sanborn contracts ====
In June 1874, Treasury Secretary William A. Richardson gave private contracts to one John D. Sanborn who in turn collected illegally withheld taxes for fees at inflated commissions. The profits from the commissions were allegedly split with Richardson and Senator Benjamin Butler, while Sanborn claimed these payments were "expenses". Senator Butler had written a loophole in the law that allowed Sanborn to collect the commissions, but Sanborn would not reveal whom he split the profits with.

==== Pratt & Boyd ====
In April 1875, it was discovered that Attorney General George H. Williams allegedly received a bribe through a $30,000 gift to his wife from a Merchant house company, Pratt & Boyd, to drop the case for fraudulent customs entries. Williams was forced to resign by Grant in 1875.

==== Delano's Department of Interior ====
By 1875, the Department of the Interior under Secretary of the Interior Columbus Delano was in serious disrepair with corruption and fraud. Profiteering prevailed in the Bureau of Indian Affairs, controlled by corrupt clerks and bogus agents. This proved to be the most serious detriment to Grant's Indian peace policy. Many agents who worked for the department made unscrupulous fortunes and retired with more money than their pay would allow at the expense and exploitation of Native Americans. Delano had allowed "Indian Attorneys" who tricked Native Americans into paying $8 a day for fraudulent representation in Washington.

Delano's son, John Delano, and Ulysses S. Grant's own brother, Orvil Grant, were discovered to have been awarded lucrative, corrupt cartographical contracts by Surveyor General Silas Reed. Neither John Delano nor Orvil Grant performed any work, nor were they qualified to hold such surveying positions. Massive fraud was also found in the Patent Office with corrupt clerks who embezzled from the government payroll. Under increasing pressure by the press and Indian reformers, Delano resigned from office on October 15, 1875. Grant appointed Zachariah Chandler as Secretary of the Interior, who replaced Delano. Chandler vigorously uncovered and cleaned up the fraud in the department by firing all the clerks and banning the phony "Indian Attorneys" access to Washington. Grant's "Quaker" or church appointments partially made up for the lack of food staples and housing from the government. Chandler cleaned up the Patent Office by firing all the corrupt clerks.

==== Whiskey Ring prosecuted ====
Grant's second term anti-corruption team

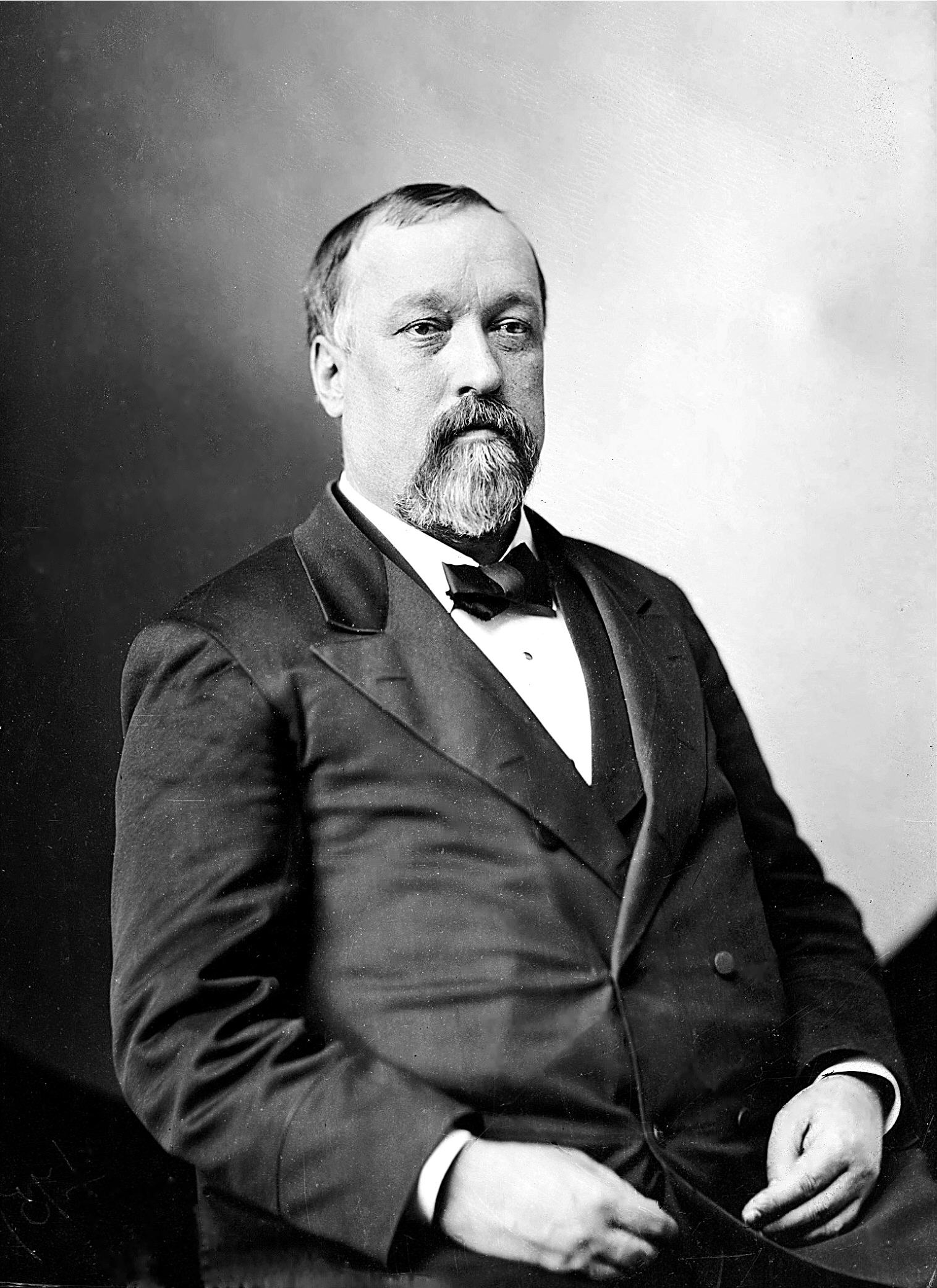
Benjamin Bristow

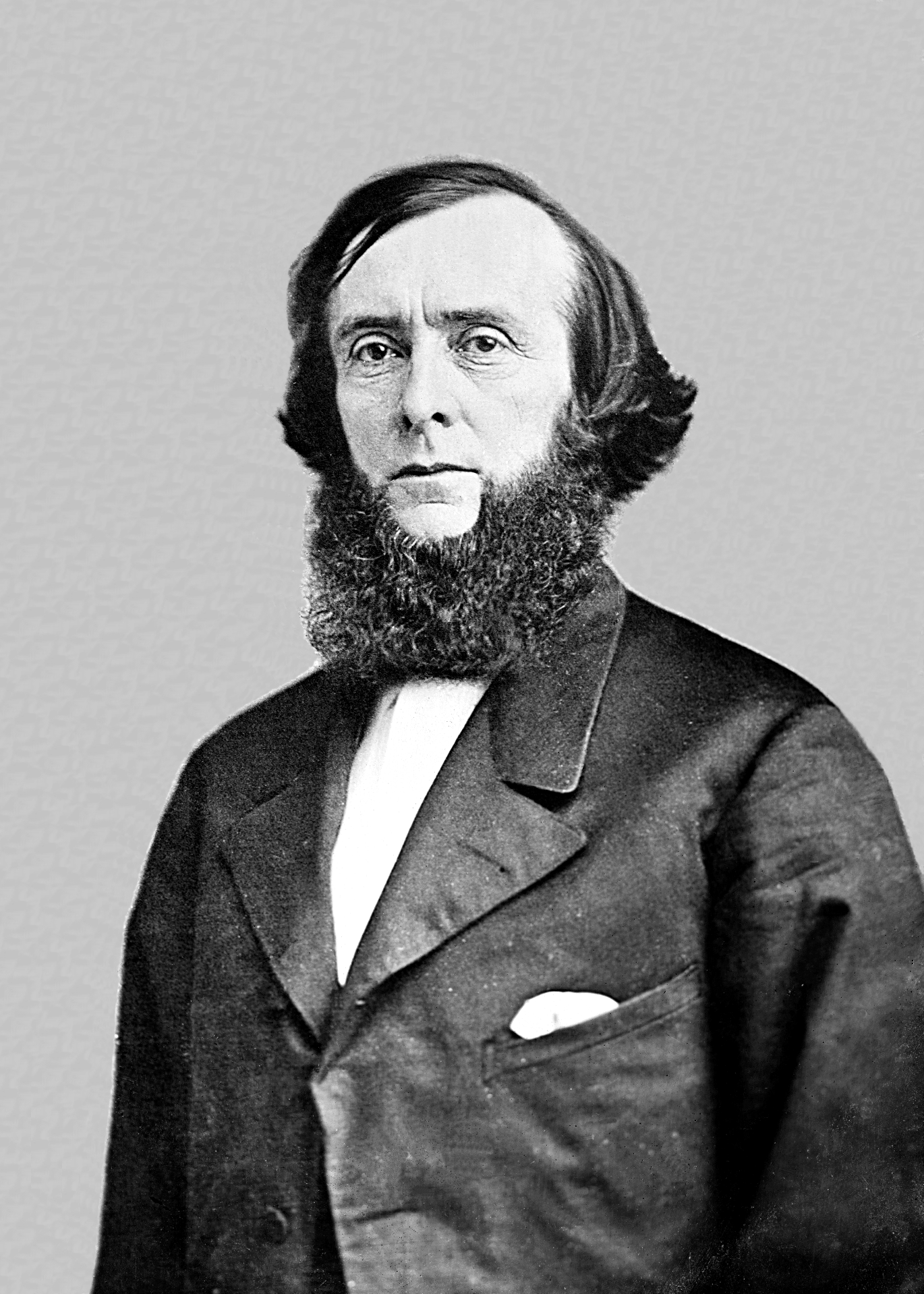
Edwards Pierrepont

Grant's presidency is often criticized for scandals, though Grant also appointed many reformers. In May 1875, Secretary of the Treasury Benjamin H. Bristow discovered that millions of dollars of taxes were being funneled into an illegal ring from whiskey manufacturers. Prosecutions ensued, and many were put in prison. Grant's private Secretary Orville E. Babcock was indicted and later acquitted in a trial. Grant's new Attorney General Edwards Pierrepont and Bristow formed an anti-corruption team to weed out criminal activity during Grant's second term. The Whiskey Ring was organized throughout the United States, and by 1875, it was a fully operating criminal association. The investigation and closure of the Whiskey Ring resulted in 230 indictments, 110 convictions, and $3,000,000 in tax revenues that were returned to the Treasury Department.

Bristow and Pierrepont brought evidence to Grant of Babcock's involvement. Grant asked Babcock, with Bristow and Pierrepont in attendance at the White House, about the evidence. Babcock gave Grant an explanation that the evidence did not concern the Ring, and Grant quietly accepted Babcock's words at face value. During the prosecution of the Whiskey Ring leaders, Grant testified on behalf of his friend Babcock. As a result, Babcock was acquitted. However, the deposition by Grant was a great embarrassment to his reputation. The Babcock trial turned into an impeachment trial against the President by Grant's political opponents.

==== Trading post ring ====
In March 1876, it was discovered under House investigations that Secretary of War William W. Belknap was taking extortion money in exchange for allowing an Indian trading post agent to remain in position at Fort Sill. Belknap was allowed to resign by Grant and, as a result, was acquitted in a Senate impeachment trial. Profits were made at the expense of Native Americans, who were supposed to receive food and clothing from the government. In late April 1876, Grant lashed out at Lieut. Col. George A. Custer, after Custer had testified at a Congressional committee one month before against Grant's brother Orville and Sec. Belknap. It was rumored that Custer had authored an article for the New York Herald titled, "Belknap's Anaconda", concerning Belknap and Indian post profiteering. Custer personally went to the White House to clear matters up with the President. However, Grant refused to see him three times. When Custer left Washington on May 3 to return to Fort Lincoln, he had been removed from overall command by Grant and denied any participation in the Sioux Campaign; having been replaced by Brig. Gen. Alfred Terry. However, at Terry's insistence, Grant relented and allowed Custer to participate in the campaign against the Sioux on the condition that he did not talk to any pressmen.

==== Cattellism ====
In March 1876, Secretary of Navy George M. Robeson was charged by a Democratic-controlled House investigation committee with giving lucrative contracts to Alexander Cattell & Company, a grain supplier, in return for real estate, loans, and payment of debts. The House investigating committee also discovered that Secretary Robeson had allegedly embezzled $15 million in naval construction appropriations. Since there were no financial paper trails or enough evidence for impeachment and conviction, the House Investigation committee admonished Robeson and claimed he had set up a corrupt contracting system known as "Cattellism".

==== Safe burglary conspiracy ====
In September 1876, Orville E. Babcock, Superintendent of Public Works and Buildings, was indicted in a safe burglary conspiracy case and trial. In April, corrupt building contractors in Washington, D.C., were on trial for graft when a safe robbery occurred. Bogus secret service agents broke into a safe and attempted to frame Columbus Alexander, who had exposed the corrupt contracting ring. Babcock was named as part of the conspiracy, but later acquitted in the trial against the burglars. Evidence suggests that Backcock was involved with the swindles by the corrupt Washington Contractors Ring, and he wanted revenge on Columbus Alexander, an avid reformer and critic of the Grant Administration. There was also evidence that the safe burglary jury had been tampered with.

=== Centennial Exposition ===
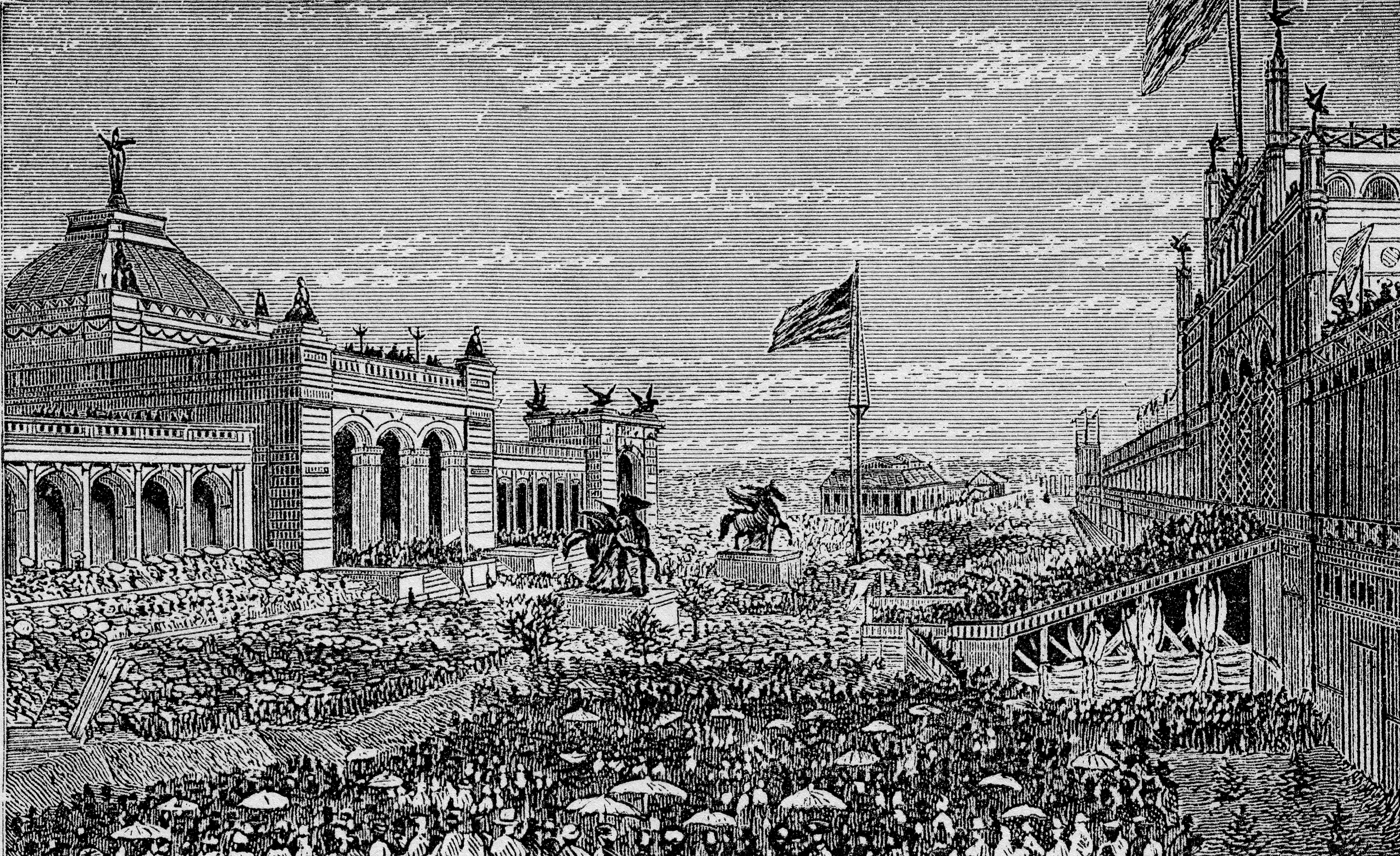
Centennial Exposition May 10, 1876

On the morning of May 10, 1876, the Centennial Exposition opened at Philadelphia's Fairmont Park. Thousands were in attendance on the Philadelphia streets.

Grant rose to speak, saying the Exposition would:

show in the direction of rivaling older and more advanced nations in law, medicine, and theology --- in science literature, philosophy, and the fine arts. One hundred years ago our country was new and but partially settled. Our necessities have compelled us to chiefly expend our means and time in felling forests, subduing prairies, building dwellings, factories, ships, docks, ware houses, roads, canals, machinery, etc. etc. Most of our schools, churches, libraries & asylums have been established within an hundred years. Burthened by these great primal works of necessity which could not be pretermitted [delayed], we yet have done what this exhibition will shew in the direction of rivaling older and more advanced nations in law, medicine and theology in science, literature, philosophy, and the fine arts. Whilst proud of what we have done, we regret that we have not done more. Our achievements have been great enough however to make it easy for our people to acknowledge superior merit wheresoever found.

=== Election of 1876 ===
In the presidential election of 1876, the Republicans nominated the fiscally conservative Rutherford B. Hayes and the Democrats nominated reformer Samuel Tilden. Results were split. Tilden received 51% of the popular vote; Hayes 48%; many black Republicans were not allowed to vote, however. Twenty key electoral votes remained undecided and in dispute. Both Republicans and Democrats claimed victory, and the threat of a second civil war was imminent. Grant was watchful, encouraged Congress to settle the election by commission, and determined to keep a peaceful transfer of power. On January 29, 1877, Grant signed the Electoral Commission Act that gave a 15-member bipartisan commission the power to determine electoral votes. The commission gave Hayes 185 electoral votes; Tilden received 184. Grant's personal honesty, firmness, and even-handedness reassured the nation, and a second civil war was averted.

== Administration and cabinet ==
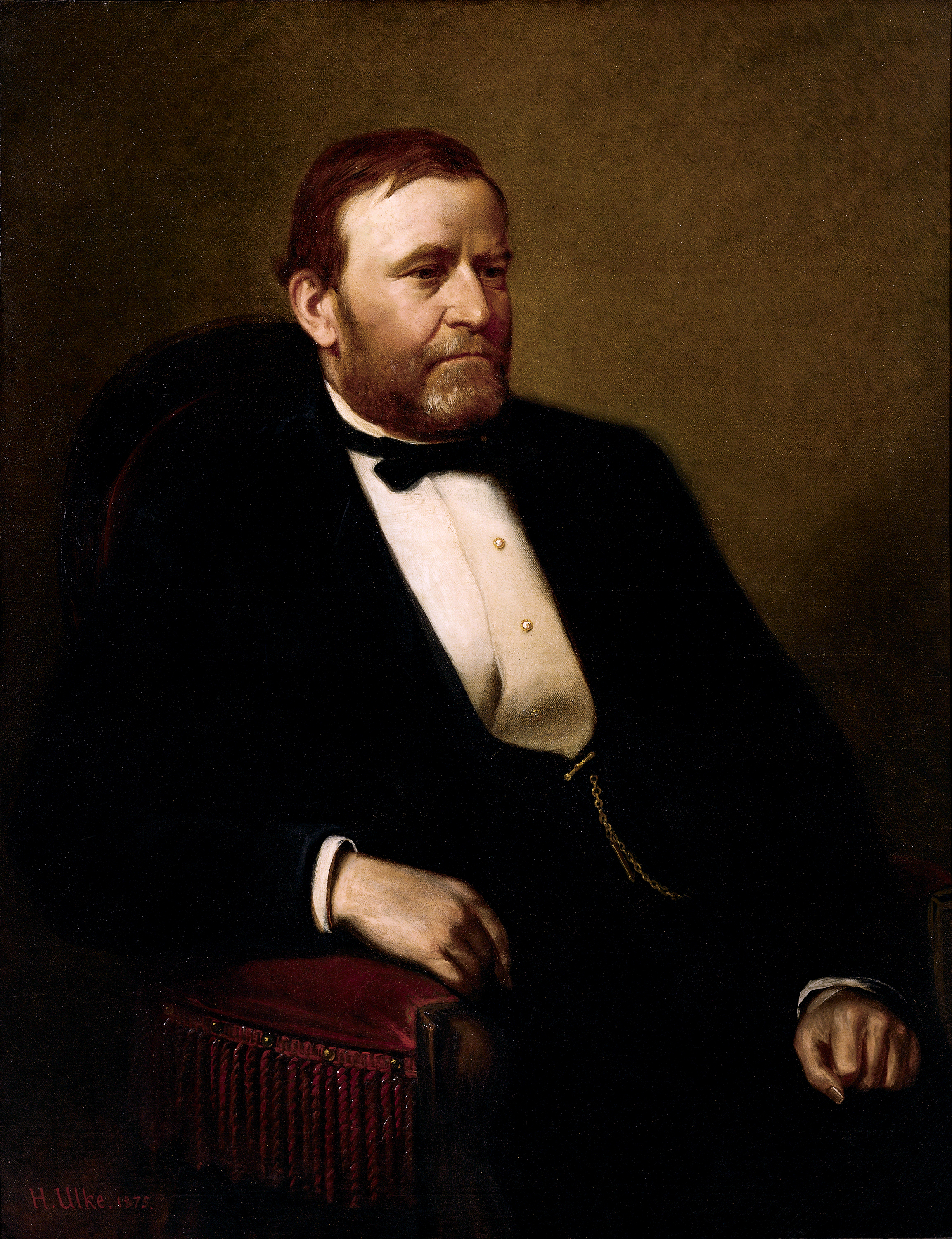
President Ulysses S. Grant Official White House Portrait Henry Ulke 1875

Grant cabinet
Office	Name	Term
President	Ulysses S. Grant	1869–1877
Vice President	Schuyler Colfax	1869–1873
Henry Wilson	1873–1875
None	1875–1877
Secretary of State	Elihu B. Washburne	1869
Hamilton Fish	1869–1877
Secretary of the Treasury	George S. Boutwell	1869–1873
William Adams Richardson	1873–1874
Benjamin Bristow	1874–1876
Lot M. Morrill	1876–1877
Secretary of War	John Schofield	1869
John Aaron Rawlins	1869
William W. Belknap	1869–1876
Alphonso Taft	1876
J. Donald Cameron	1876–1877
Attorney General	Ebenezer R. Hoar	1869–1870
Amos T. Akerman	1870–1871
George Henry Williams	1871–1875
Edwards Pierrepont	1875–1876
Alphonso Taft	1876–1877
Postmaster General	John Creswell	1869–1874
James William Marshall	1874
Marshall Jewell	1874–1876
James Noble Tyner	1876–1877
Secretary of the Navy	Adolph E. Borie	1869
George M. Robeson	1869–1877
Secretary of the Interior	Jacob Dolson Cox	1869–1870
Columbus Delano	1870–1875
Zachariah Chandler	1875–1877

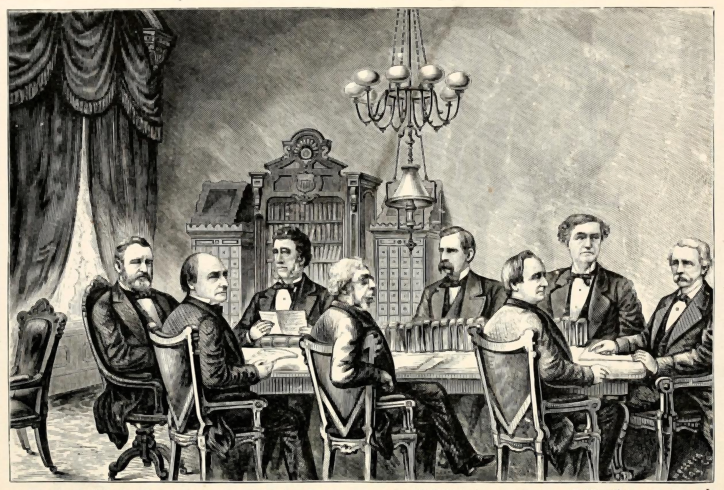
President Grant's Cabinet, 1876–1877

== Judicial appointments ==
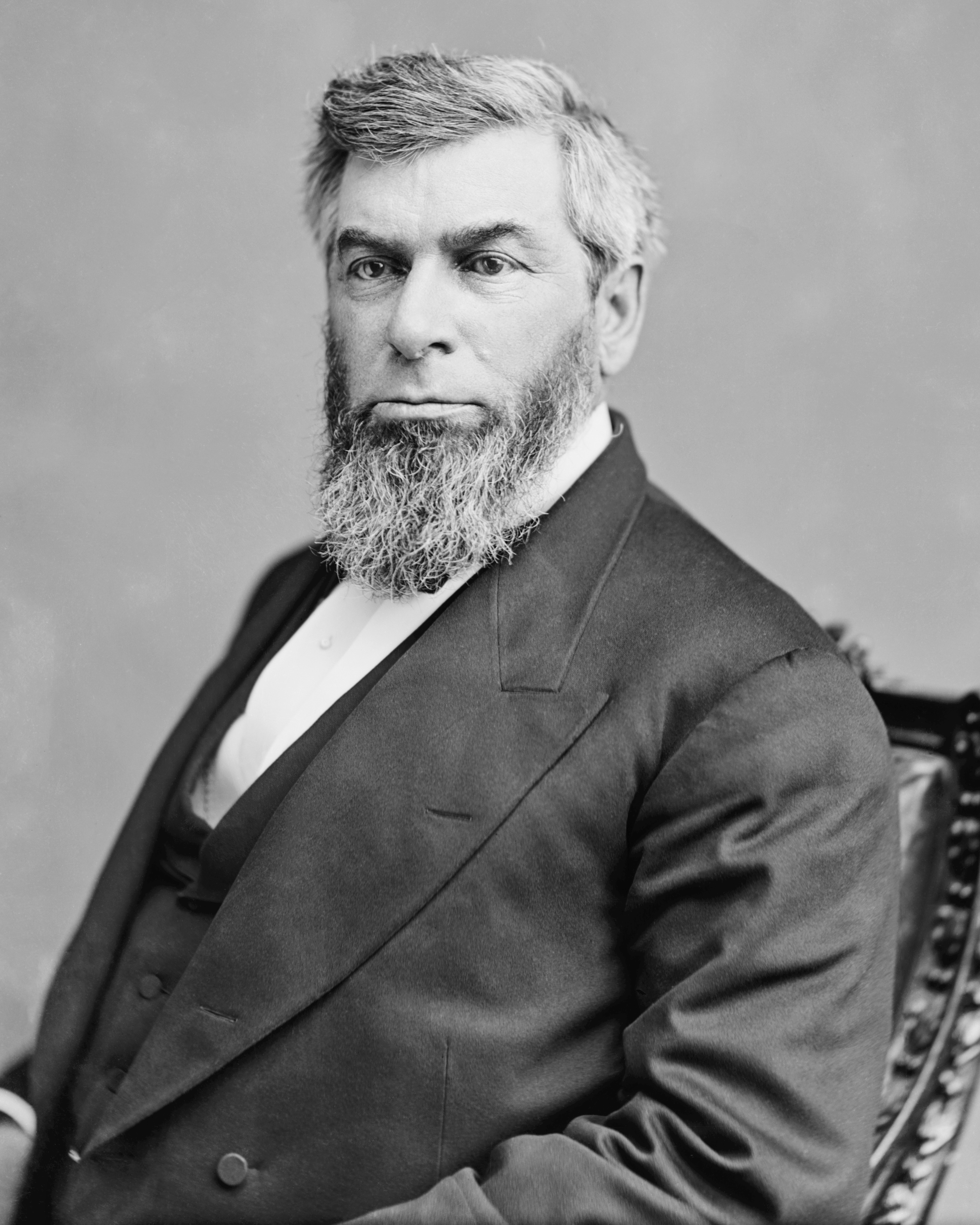
Morrison Waite 7th Chief Justice of the United States, March 4, 1874 – March 23, 1888

Grant appointed four Justices to the Supreme Court of the United States during his presidency. When Grant took office, there were eight seats on the bench. Congress had passed a Judicial Circuits Act in 1866, which provided for the elimination of one seat on the Court each time a justice retired, to prevent Andrew Johnson from nominating replacements for them. In April 1869, Congress passed a Judiciary Act which fixed the size of the Supreme Court at nine.

Grant had the opportunity to fill two Supreme Court seats in 1869. His initial nominees were:

- Ebenezer R. Hoar, nominated December 14, 1869, was rejected by the Senate (Vote: 24–33) on February 3, 1870.
- Edwin M. Stanton, nominated December 20, 1869, confirmed by the Senate (vote: 46–11) on December 20, 1869, died before he took office.

He subsequently submitted two more nominees who were successfully appointed:

- William Strong, nominated February 7, 1870, confirmed by the Senate on February 18, 1870.
- Joseph P. Bradley, nominated February 7, 1870, confirmed by the Senate (vote: 46–9) on March 21, 1870.

Both men were railroad lawyers, and their appointment led to accusations that Grant intended them to overturn the case of Hepburn v. Griswold, which had been decided the same day they were nominated. In that case, which was unpopular with business interests, held that the federal debt incurred before 1862 must be paid in gold, not greenbacks. Nonetheless, both Strong and Bradley were confirmed, and the following year Hepburn was indeed reversed.

Grant had the opportunity to fill two more seats during his second term. To fill the first vacancy, he nominated:

- Ward Hunt, nominated December 3, 1872, confirmed by the Senate on December 11, 1872.

In May 1873, Chief Justice Salmon P. Chase died suddenly. Grant initially offered the seat to Senator Roscoe Conkling, who declined, as did Senator Timothy Howe. Grant made three attempts to fill vacancies:

- George Henry Williams, nominated December 1, 1873, withdrawn on January 8, 1874. The Senate had a dim view of Williams's performance at the Justice Department and refused to act on the nomination.
- Caleb Cushing, nominated January 9, 1874, withdrawn on January 13, 1874. Cushing was an eminent lawyer and respected in his field, but the emergence of his wartime correspondence with Jefferson Davis doomed his nomination.
- Morrison Waite, nominated January 19, 1874, confirmed by the Senate (vote: 63–0) on January 21, 1874. Waite was an uncontroversial nominee, but in his time on the Court, he authored two of the decisions (United States v. Reese and United States v. Cruikshank) that did the most to undermine Reconstruction-era laws for the protection of black Americans.

== States admitted to the Union ==
- Colorado – August 1, 1876

== Vetoes ==
Grant vetoed more bills than any of his predecessors with 93 vetoes during the 41st through 44th Congresses. 45 were regular vetoes, and 48 of them were pocket vetoes. Grant had 4 vetoes overridden by Congress.

== Government agencies instituted ==
- Department of Justice (1870)
- Office of the Solicitor General (1870)
- United States Civil Service Commission (1871); Congressional appropriations expired in 1873, however, the commission continued to function. The Pendleton Civil Service Reform Act in 1883 renewed appropriations and enhanced the federal power and scope of the commission. Grant's U.S. Attorney General Amos T. Akerman ruled that the Civil Service Commission was Constitutional as long as the purpose was to increase government's power to higher qualified workers and improve the efficiency of running the government. Akerman stated that the Civil Service Commission did not have the Constitutional power to stop or prevent appointments.
- Office of the Surgeon General (1871)
- Army Weather Bureau (currently known as the National Weather Service) (1870)

== Historical evaluations ==
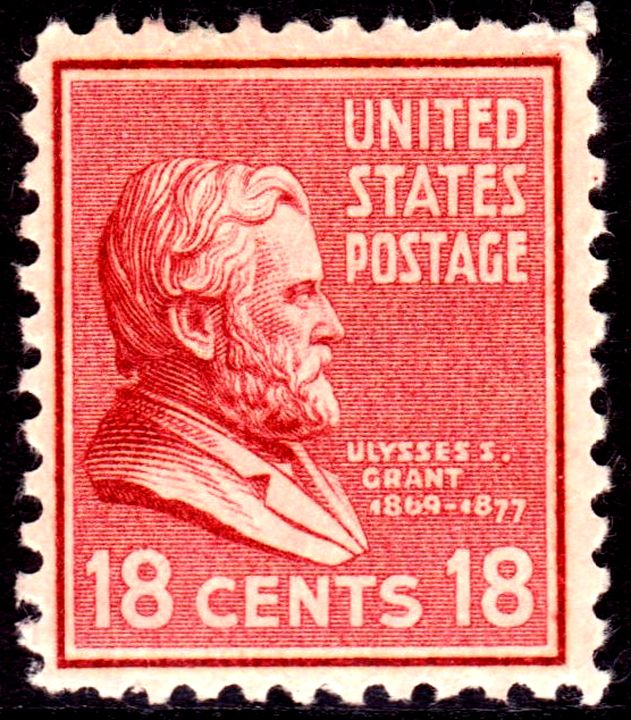
US Grant 1938 Issue-18c

Ulysses S Grant by Otto Walter Beck

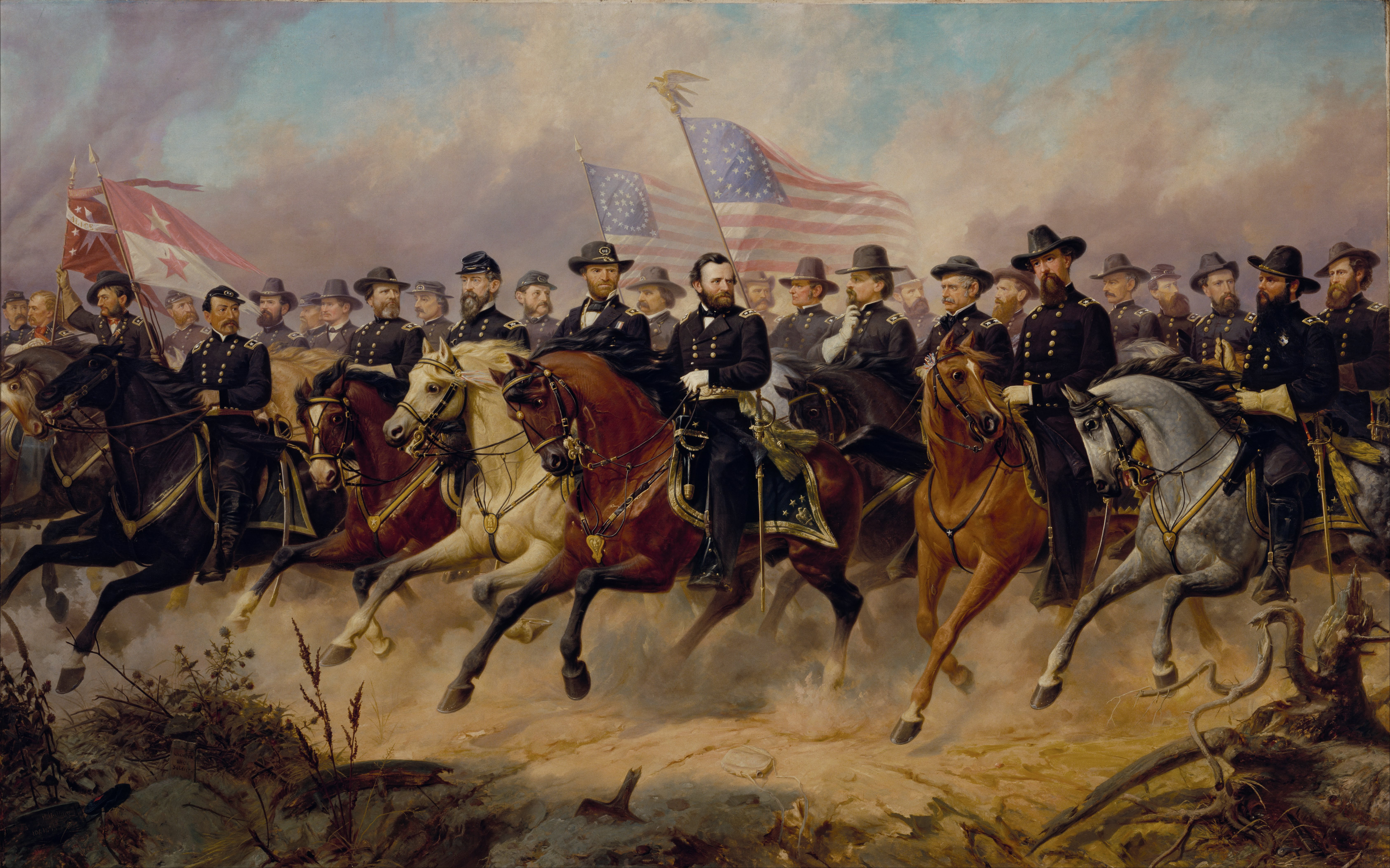
Ole Peter Hansen Balling - Grant and His Generals

Historians long saw Grant's time as president as weak and corrupt. A closer look shows he had wins and losses over his two terms. Lately, experts have raised his rank for backing African American rights. He pushed for the 15th Amendment and signed the Civil Rights Act of 1875. That law let all citizens use public places. He backed Radicals and their Reconstruction plans. He passed the Force Acts to fight the Ku Klux Klan. In foreign affairs, he earned praise for the Treaty of Washington. It fixed the Alabama Claims with Britain by arbitration. On money matters, he favored East Coast bankers. He signed the Public Credit Act to pay U.S. debts in gold. Yet people blamed it for the hard times from 1873 to 1877. He became the first president to seek a line item veto. Congress turned him down.

Grant's presidency overflowed with scandals from lax standards and sloppy choices of appointees and close friends. Nepotism ran unchecked under Grant, as nearly forty relatives pocketed cash from government jobs. His ties to those scandals damaged his reputation during his presidency and later. Even so, by the end of Grant's second term, new cabinet members cleared corruption from the Interior Department (1875), Treasury (1874), and Justice (1875). Grant's reputation and ranking increased significantly in the 21st century, following a series of positive biographies by noted historians such as: Grant by Jean Edward Smith, The Man Who Saved the Union: Ulysses Grant in War and Peace by H.W. Brands, and American Ulysses: A Life of Ulysses S. Grant by Ronald C. White. Historian Joan Waugh said Grant took steps where a few other presidents attempted "in the areas of Native American policy, civil service reform, and African American rights." Waugh said Grant "executed a successful foreign policy and was responsible for improving Anglo-American relations." Interest in his presidency has also increased by historians, that included Josiah H Bunting III, Ulysses S. Grant: The American Presidents Series: The 18th President.

Surveys of scholars and political scientists had ranked Grant unfavorably in the 20th century. A 1962 survey by Arthur M. Schlesinger Sr. ranked Grant the second worst president in US history; the same ranking was given in a 1982 survey by Robert K. Murray and Tim H. Blessing. 21st century surveys have ranked him more favorably, such as a 2008 survey by The Times which ranked him at 18th, a 2017 survey by C-SPAN ranking him as the median, a 2018 survey by the American Political Science Association (APSA) ranking him at 21st, and a 2024 survey by APSA ranking him at 17th.

In the 21st century no presidential administration and president has seen a greater positive increase in evaluation than Grant's. During the Biden Administration the military ranking of Grant was increased to the Five-Star General of the Armies of the United States, which moved Grant up to equivalent ranking of George Washington and John Pershing. His administration's strong emphasis on reconstruction, increased enforcement against mob violence, and a liberal monetary policy has also been emphasized by historians in recent years.

== Bibliography ==
=== By author ===
- Ames, Mary Clemner (1879). Ten years in Washington. Hartford, Worthington.
- Belz, Paul H. (December 25, 2017). "How Christmas Got Its Start". Hartfort Courant.
- Brands, H. W. (2012a). The Man Who Saved The Union Ulysses S. Grant in War and Peace. New York: Doubleday.
- Brands, H. W. (December 2012b). "Presidents in Crisis Grant: Takes on the Klan". American History: 42–47.
- Bordewich, Fergus M. (2023). Klan War Ulysses S. Grant and the Battle to Save Reconstruction. New York: Vintage Books. ISBN 978-0-593-31782-2.
- Boutwell, George S. (2008) [First published 1902]. Reminiscences of Sixty Years in Public Affairs. New York: Greenwood Press. pp. 131–133. OCLC 1857.
- Bradford, Richard H. (1980). The Virginius Affair. Boulder, Colorado: Colorado Associated University Press. ISBN 978-0-87081-080-0. OCLC 6675742.
- Bunting III, Josiah (2004). "The Original Inhabitants". Ulysses S. Grant. New York: Times Books. pp. 117–118. ISBN 978-0-8050-6949-5. OCLC 54803737.
- Calhoun, Charles W. (2017). Presidency of Ulysses S. Grant. University Press of Kansas.
- Chamberlain, Daniel Henry (1902). Charles Sumner and the Treaty of Washington. Worcester, Massachusetts: Press of G.G. Davis. Chamberlain reviewed speech by Charles Francis Adams to New York Historical Society on November 19, 1901.
- Chang, Gordon H. (2003). "Whose "Barbarism"? Whose "Treachery"? Race and Civilization in the Unknown United States-Korea War of 1871". The Journal of American History. 89 (4): 1331–1365. doi:10.2307/3092545. ISSN 0021-8723. JSTOR 3092545.
- Chernow, Ron (2017). Grant. New York: Penguin Press. ISBN 978-1-5942-0487-6.; doi:10.14296/RiH/2014/2270 online review
- Corning, Amos Elwood (1918). Hamilton Fish. New York: Lamere Publishing Company. OCLC 2959737.
- DeForrest, Mark Edward (2003). "An Overview and Evaluation of State Blaine Amendments: Origins, Scope, and First Amendment Concerns". Harvard Journal of Law & Public Policy. 26: 551.
- DeLony, Eric. "Context for World Heritage Bridges". International Council on Monuments and Sites. Archived from the original on January 9, 2012.
- Donald, David (1970). Charles Sumner and the Rights of Man. New York: Knopf. ISBN 0-394-41899-9.
- Donovan, James (2008). A Terrible Glory. New York: Back Bay Books/Little, Brown and Company. ISBN 978-0316155786.
- Duncan, Russell (1986). "Introduction". Freedom's shore: Tunis Campbell and the Georgia freedmen. Athens, Georgia: University of Georgia Press. pp. 9–10. ISBN 978-0-8203-0876-0. OCLC 13334307.
- Etcheson, Nicole (June 2009). "Reconstruction and the Making of a Free-Labor South". Reviews in American History. 37 (2): 236–242. doi:10.1353/rah.0.0101. ISSN 0048-7511. OCLC 1783629. S2CID 146573684.
- Foner, Eric (2014). Reconstruction: America's Unfinished Revolution. New York: First Perennial Classics. ISBN 978-0-06-235451-8.
- Fuller, Joseph V. (1931). "Fish, Hamilton". Dictionary of American Biography. New York: Charles Scribner's Sons. pp. 397–400.
- Garland, Hamlin (1898). Ulysses S. Grant: His Life and Character. New York: Doubleday and McClure Company. p. 438. ISBN 0-548-13253-4. OCLC 11394591.
- Gray, John S. (1976). Centennial Campaign The Sioux War of 1876. University of Oklahoma: University of Oklahoma Press. ISBN 0-8061-2152-1.
- Grossman, Mark (2003). Political Corruption in America: An Encyclopedia of Scandals, Power, and Greed. Santa Barbara, California: ABC-CLIO. pp. 308–309. ISBN 978-1-57607-060-4. OCLC 52418234. "A.J. Creswell Scandal."
- Hesseltine, William Best (1935) [First published 1935]. "Chapter XI: The End of Reconstruction". Ulysses S. Grant, Politician. New York: Dodd, Mead. ISBN 1-931313-85-7. OCLC 312581. (subscription required)
- Hinsdale, Mary Louise (1911). A History of the President's Cabinet. G. Wahr. p. 207.
- Howe, George Frederick (1935). Chester A. Arthur A Quarter-Century of Machine Politics. New York: Frederick Unger Publishing Co.
- Hutton, Paul Andrew, Ph.D. (2009) [First published 1985]. "Chapter 12: Reconstructing Louisiana: 'To Charge upon the Liberties of His Fellow-Citizens'". Phil Sheridan and his Army. Norman, Oklahoma: University of Oklahoma Press. pp. 262–266. ISBN 978-0-8032-2329-5. OCLC 10694656.
- Johnson, Benjamin S. (1908). John Hugh Reynolds (ed.). "The Brooks-Baxter War". Publications of the Arkansas Historical Association. 2. Little Rock, Arkansas: Arkansas Historical Association: 122–168. OCLC 13681571.
- Kahan, Paul (2018). The Presidency of Ulysses S. Grant: Preserving the Civil War's Legacy. Yardley, Pennsylvania: Westholme Publishing, LLC. ISBN 978-1-59416-273-2.
- Keith, LeeAnna (2007). "Chapter 7: Battle of the Colfax Courthouse". The Colfax Massacre: The Untold Story of Black Power, White Terror, & The Death of Reconstruction. New York: Oxford University Press. p. 100. ISBN 978-0-19-531026-9. OCLC 145145411.
- Kennedy, Robert C. (2001). "George M. Robeson". Dvrbs.com. Archived from the original on April 21, 2016.
- Kinley, David (1910). "Chapter VIII – Treasury Relief in Crises, 1873 to 1890". The Independent Treasury of the United States and its Relations to the Banks of its Country. Washington, D.C.: U.S. National Monetary Commission, United States Senate. pp. 225–235. OCLC 474950853.
- Kremer, Gary R. (1991). "Chapter V: The Preservation of a Noble Experiment". James Milton Turner and the Promise of America – The Public Life of a Post-Civil War Black Leader. Columbia, Missouri: University of Missouri Press. p. 81. ISBN 978-0-8262-0780-7. OCLC 23144878.
- Lane, Charles (2008). "Chapter Six: Black-Letter Law". The Day Freedom Died: The Colfax Massacre, the Supreme Court, and the Betrayal of Reconstruction. New York: Henry Holt and Company. p. 124. ISBN 978-0-8050-8922-6. OCLC 172984718.
- Leonard, Lewis Alexander (1920). Life of Alphonso Taft. New York: Hawke Publishing Company. OCLC 60738535. "Life of Alphonso Taft."
- McFeely, William S. (2002) [First published 1981]. Grant: A Biography. New York: W. W. Norton & Company. ISBN 978-0-393-01372-6. OCLC 6889578., Pulitzer prize, but hostile to Grant
  - Simpson, Brooks D. "Butcher? Racist? An Examination of William S. McFeely's Grant: A Biography" Civil War History 33#1 (1987) 63-83 online argues against McFeely. Simpson says Grant tried to minimize casualties and strongly supported Black rights in 1860s-1870s
- Michno, Gregory F. (2003). Encyclopedia of Indian Wars. Missoula, Montana: Mountain Press Publishing Company. ISBN 0-87842-468-7.
- Miller, Nathan (1997) [First published 1977]. "Chapter 6: The Naval Renaissance". The U.S. Navy: A History (3rd ed.). Annapolis, Maryland: Naval Institute Press. pp. 146–147. ISBN 978-1-55750-595-8. OCLC 37211290.
- Muench, James F. (2006). Five Stars: Missouri's Most Famous Generals. Columbia, Missouri: University of Missouri Press. p. 74. ISBN 978-0-8262-1656-4. OCLC 191943891.
- Nevins, Allan (1937). Hamilton Fish: The Inner History of the Grant Administration. New York: Macmillan. ISBN 978-0-8044-1676-4. OCLC 478495. Archived from the original on June 4, 2011 – via Questia.
- Nevins, Allan (1957). Hamilton Fish: The Inner History of the Grant Administration. Vol. 2.
- Oberholtzer, Ellis Paxson (1922). A history of the United States since the Civil War. Vol. 2–3. New York: Macmillan. ISBN 0-8371-2642-8. OCLC 1535877.
- Olson, James C. (1965). "Chapter 7: Red Cloud Visits the Great White Father". Red Cloud and the Sioux problem. Lincoln, Nebraska: University of Nebraska Press. p. 103. ISBN 978-0-8032-5817-4. OCLC 728240.
- Prucha, Francis Paul (1984). "Chapter 20: Structures of the Peace Policy". The Great Father: The United States Government and the American Indians. Lincoln, Nebraska: University of Nebraska Press. pp. 501–503. ISBN 978-0-8032-3668-4. OCLC 9918967.
- Rhodes, James Ford (1906a). History of the United States from the Compromise of 1850 to the Final Restoration of Home Rule at the South in 1877: vol. 6: 1866–1872. Macmillan.
- Rhodes, James Ford (1906b). History of the United States from the Compromise of 1850 to the Final Restoration of Home Rule at the South in 1877: v. 7, 1872–1877. New York: Macmillan.
- Rhodes, James Ford (1912). History of the United States from the Compromise of 1850 to the Final Restoration of Home Rule at the South in 1877: v. 7, 1872–1877. New York: Macmillan.
- Rives, Timothy (Fall 2000). "Grant, Babcock, and the Whiskey Ring". Prologue. 32 (3).
- Salinger, Lawrence M. (2005). Encyclopedia of White-collar & Corporate Crime, Volume 2. Thousand Oaks, California: Sage Publications. pp. 374–375. ISBN 978-0-7619-3004-4.
- Scaturro, Frank (October 26, 2006). "The Presidency of Ulysses S. Grant, 1869–1877". College of St. Scholastica. Archived from the original on July 19, 2011.
- Schmiel, Eugene D. (2014). Citizen-General: Jacob Dolson Cox and the Civil War Era. Athens, Ohio: Ohio University Press. ISBN 978-0-8214-2082-9.
- Sim, David (September 2008). "The Peace Policy of Ulysses S. Grant". American Nineteenth Century History. 9 (3): 241–268. doi:10.1080/14664650802408476. ISSN 1466-4658. OCLC 262551023. S2CID 145576858.
- Simon, John Y. (2002). "Ulysses S. Grant". In Graff, Henry (ed.). The Presidents: A Reference History (3rd ed.).
- Simon, John Y. (1997). Ulysses S. Grant. Southern Illinois University Press. pp. 258–259. ISBN 0-8093-0637-9.
- Simpson, Brooks D. (2014). Let Us Have Peace: Ulysses S. Grant and the Politics of War and Reconstruction, 1861–1868. U of North Carolina Press. ISBN 9781469617466.
- Simpson, Brooks D. The Reconstruction Presidents (1998) pp. 133–196 on Grant.
- Skidmore, Max J. (2005). "The Presidency of Ulysses S. Grant: a Reconsideration". White House Studies. 5 (2): 255–270.
- Smith, Jean Edward (2001). Grant. New York: Simon & Schuster. ISBN 978-0-684-84926-3. OCLC 45387618.
- Trelease, Allen W. (1995) [1971]. White Terror: The Ku Klux Klan Conspiracy and Southern Reconstruction. Baton Rouge, Louisiana: Louisiana State University Press. ISBN 978-0-06-131731-6. OCLC 4194613.
- Unger, Irwin (1964). The Greenback Era: A Social and Political History of American Finance, 1865–1879. Princeton, New Jersey: Princeton University Press. ISBN 978-0-691-04517-7. OCLC 710949.
- Utley, Robert M. (1984a) [First published 1973]. Frontier Regulars: the United States Army and the Indian, 1866–1891. New York: Macmillan. p. 206. ISBN 978-0-8032-9551-3. OCLC 867414.
- Utley, Robert M. (1984b). "Chapter 5: Grant's Peace Policy: 1869–1876". The Indian frontier of the American West, 1846–1890. Albuquerque: University of New Mexico Press. pp. 127–133. ISBN 978-0-8263-0715-6. OCLC 9685353.
- Utley, Robert M.; Mackintosh, Barry (1989). Early Problems and Personalities. Washington, D.C.: U.S. Department of the Interior. OCLC 18206270. Archived from the original on August 17, 2007.
- Waugh, Joan (2017). "Ulysses S. Grant: Impact and Legacy". Miller Center of Public Affairs, University of Virginia.
- Weisberger, Bernard A. (November 1995). "The Item And "fight 'em" Veto". American Heritage. 46 (7).
- White, Richard (2017). The Republic for Which It Stands: The United States during Reconstruction and the Gilded Age, 1865–1896. Oxford University Press. ISBN 978-0199735815.
- White, Ronald C. (2016). American Ulysses: A Life of Ulysses S. Grant. Random House Publishing Group. ISBN 978-1-5883-6992-5.
- White, Ron (December 23, 2017b). "Remember it was a President, Ulysses S. Grant, who made Christmas a national holiday". New York Daily News.
- Woodward, C. Vann (April 1957). "The Lowest Ebb". American Heritage. 8 (3).
- Woodward, Earl F. (Winter 1971). "The Brooks and Baxter War in Arkansas, 1872–1874". The Arkansas Historical Quarterly. 30 (4). Little Rock, Arkansas: Arkansas Historical Association: 315–336. doi:10.2307/40038083. ISSN 0004-1823. JSTOR 40038083. OCLC 483181342.
- Wooster, Robert (1988). The Military and United States Indian Policy, 1865–1903. New Haven, Connecticut: Yale University Press. ISBN 0-8032-9767-X.
- Zuczek, Richard (2006). Encyclopedia of the Reconstruction Era: A–L. Westport, Connecticut: Greenwood Press. p. 413. ISBN 978-0-313-33074-2. OCLC 255417560.
- Zuczek, Richard (1996). State of Rebellion: Reconstruction in South Carolina. Columbia, South Carolina: University of South Carolina Press. pp. 159–165, 170–172, 174, 176. ISBN 978-1-57003-105-2. OCLC 33971572.
- Streets of Washington (2017). "A closer look: The frigid second inauguration of Ulysses S. Grant". Streets of Washington Stories and images of historic Washington, D.C.

=== By title (anonymous) ===
- "Biographies of the Secretaries of State: Hamilton Fish (1808–1893)". Department of State.
- "C-SPAN 2009 Historians Presidential Leadership Survey". C-SPAN.org. 2009. Archived from the original on June 13, 2010.
- "Henry Wilson, 18th Vice President (1873–1875)". United States Senate.
- "The Whiskey Ring". PoliticalCorruption.net. February 9, 2009. Archived from the original on November 27, 2009.
- "The American Presidency Project Election of 1876".

=== Newspaper articles ===
- "Amnesty and Civil Rights" (PDF). The New York Times. May 23, 1872.
- "The Civil Rights Bill" (PDF). The New York Times. March 2, 1875. pp. 1–2.
- "The Conduct of the Finances". The New York Times. July 17, 1872.
- "The Emma Mine Scandal" (PDF). The New York Times. March 4, 1876.
- "The Safe Burglary Case: Columbus Alexander and Major Richards of the Washington Police Examined". The New York Times. September 23, 1876.
- "The Safe Burglary Case: Preparing for the trial – Witnesses for the defense summoned". The New York Times. September 8, 1876.
- E.G.D. (October 9, 1893). "The Pantaloon of the Senate: A Reminiscence of the Emma Mine Scandal" (PDF). The New York Times.
