= Porter (name) =

Origin
- Origin: Old French
- Meaning: "gatekeeper"
- Region of origin: England

Porter (\p(o)-rter\) is an English surname and also a given name. The name originates as an Old French occupational name, portier (gatekeeper), or porteour ("to carry"). Its earliest public record is 1086 at Winchester Castle. With transferred use, Porter also became a unisex given name with varied popularity. According to the U.S. Social Security Administration, Porter ranked #433 in 1907, declined to #1002 in 1944, and then rebounded to #476 in 2006.

== Surname ==
- Porter (surname)

== Given name ==
Porter
- Pronunciation: pawr-ter
- Gender: Male

Origin
- Origin: Old French
- Meaning: "Gatekeeper"
- Region of origin: England

- Porter Blanchard (1886–1973), American silversmith
- Porter Cottrell (born 1962), American bodybuilder
- Porter H. Dale (1867–1933), US congressman and senator from Vermont
- Porter Goss (born 1938), CIA director and US congressman from Florida
- Porter Gustin (born 1997), American football player
- Porter Hall (1888–1953), American film and stage actor
- Porter King (1857–1901), American politician from Alabama and Georgia
- Porter Lainhart (1907–1991), American football player
- Porter J. McCumber (1858–1933), US senator from North Dakota
- Porter Moser (born 1968), American basketball coach
- Porter Robinson (born 1992), American producer and DJ
- Porter Rockwell (1813 or 1815–1878), American gunfighter, deputy United States Marshal and Mormon leadership bodyguard
- Porter Wagoner (1927–2007), American country music singer

== See also ==
- Attorney General Porter (disambiguation), multiple people
- General Porter (disambiguation), multiple people
- Justice Porter (disambiguation), multiple people
- Senator Porter (disambiguation), multiple people
