= Orville E. Babcock =

Union Army general (1835–1884)

Orville Elias Babcock
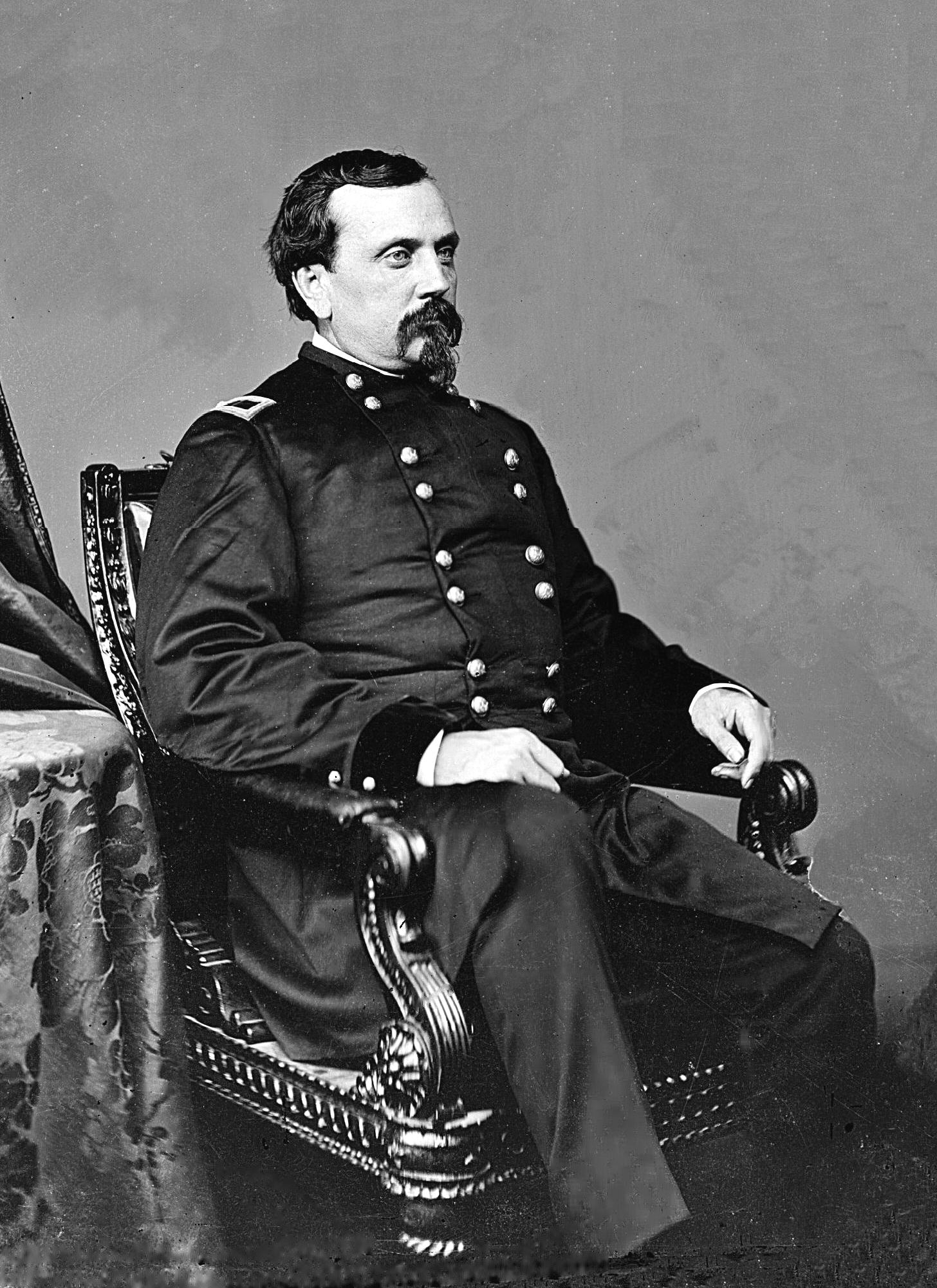
- Orville E. Babcock
- Born: December 25, 1835; Franklin, Vermont, US
- Died: June 2, 1884 (aged 48); Mosquito Inlet, Florida, US
- Burial place: Arlington National Cemetery
- Military career
- Allegiance: United States of America; Union
- Branch: United States Army; Union Army
- Service years: 1861–1884
- Rank: Colonel; Brevet Brigadier General
- Unit: United States Army Corps of Engineers
- Conflicts: American Civil War; Peninsular Campaign; Siege of Yorktown; Battle of Fredericksburg; Siege of Vicksburg; Battle of Blue Springs; Knoxville Campaign; Battle of Fort Sanders; Overland Campaign
- Other work: Private Secretary for President Ulysses S. Grant (1869–1877)

Orville Elias Babcock (December 25, 1835 – June 2, 1884) was an American engineer and general in the Union Army during the Civil War. An aide to General Ulysses S. Grant during and after the war, he was President Grant's military private secretary at the White House, Superintendent of Buildings and Grounds for Washington D.C., and a Florida-based federal inspector of lighthouses. Babcock continued to serve as lighthouse inspector under Grant's successors Rutherford B. Hayes, James A. Garfield, and Chester A. Arthur.

A native of Vermont, Babcock graduated third in his class at West Point in 1861, and served in the United States Army Corps of Engineers throughout the Civil War. As Assistant Engineer and aide-de-camp for district commander Nathaniel P. Banks, in 1862 Babcock worked on fortifications to aid in defending the nation's capital from Confederate attack. Babcock later served as aide-de-camp for Ulysses S. Grant and participated in the Overland Campaign. He was promoted to brevet brigadier general in 1865 and continued on Grant's staff during Reconstruction. In 1866, Babcock took an extensive tour of the U.S. Army western military posts and confronted Mormon leader Brigham Young over polygamy in Utah, believing the religious sect held "fanatical views". In 1867, Babcock warned Grant of a white supremacist insurgency that used Confederate symbolism to intimidate blacks in the South.

After Grant became President in 1869, Babcock was assigned Grant's Secretary to the President of the United States—in modern terms, the chief of staff—and he served until his departure from the White House in 1876. Young and ambitious, critics considered Babcock the Iago of the Grant administration. He remained on the Army rolls during his service in the White House, which limited the ability of Congress to oversee or influence his activities. This circumstance became an issue when he was accused of crimes while in office. In addition to his position in the White House, Grant appointed Babcock Superintendent of Public Buildings and Grounds for Washington, DC. In 1869, Grant sent him on a mission to explore the possibility of annexing the island nation of Santo Domingo to the United States, but the Senate, led by Charles Sumner, rejected the proposal.

Babcock's tenure under Grant was controversial. He was criminally indicted twice over corruption charges and associated with four scandals. Grant shielded Babcock from political attack out of a loyalty bond that stemmed primarily from their shared battle experiences during the Civil War. After Babcock was indicted as a member of the Whiskey Ring in 1875, Grant provided a written deposition on Babcock's behalf—a first for a sitting president—which was admitted at Babcock's 1876 trial, and resulted in his acquittal. Upon his return from St. Louis, Grant gave in to pressure from Secretary of State Hamilton Fish and forced Babcock to leave the White House. A second indictment, in 1876, over the Safe Burglary Conspiracy, ended in an acquittal, but further alienated Babcock from Republicans who favored government reform, while public opinion turned against him.

Despite dismissing him from the White House, Grant did not desert his wartime comrade; in February 1877, he appointed Babcock Inspector of Lighthouses for the Federal Lighthouse Board's Fifth District, a low-profile post that did not attract undue public attention. In 1882, President Chester A. Arthur additionally appointed Babcock as Inspector of Lighthouses for the Sixth District. Babcock was the chief engineer overseeing plans for the construction of the Mosquito Inlet Lighthouse. He died on duty in 1884 when he drowned off Mosquito Inlet in Daytona Beach, Florida. Babcock's historical reputation is mixed; his technical engineering expertise, efficiency, bravery in battle, and Union loyalty were offset by his involvement in corruption, deception, and scandal. Contrary to most of his contemporaries, Babcock also held no racial animosity toward blacks, which played a part in his advocacy of Grant's plan to annex Santo Domingo.

== Early life ==
Orville E. Babcock was born on December 25, 1835, in Franklin, Vermont, a small town located near the Canada–US border close to Lake Champlain. Babcock's father was Elias Babcock Jr. and his mother was Clara Olmsted. Among his siblings was Lorenzo A. Babcock, the first attorney general of Minnesota Territory. While growing up, he received a common education in the schools of Berkshire, Vermont. At the age of 16, Babcock was appointed to the West Point Military Academy (USMA), where he graduated third in a class of 45 on May 6, 1861. His high class ranking enabled Babcock to select his branch, and he chose the Engineers, as did most top graduates of his era.

== Civil War (1861–1865) ==
=== Constructed Washington D.C. defense works ===
The American Civil War was beginning as Babcock was graduating; he was commissioned as a Brevet Second Lieutenant in the Corps of Engineers and assigned to duty as an Assistant Engineer for the military district that included Washington. His first mission was the undertaking of efforts to improve the defensive works of Washington, D.C., and protect the city from attack. On July 13, 1861, Babcock was assigned to the Department of Pennsylvania. In August, he received his commission as a second lieutenant, to date from his West Point graduation in May; he was assigned to the Department of the Shenandoah, and constructed military fortifications on the Potomac River and in the Shenandoah Valley while also serving as aide-de-camp under Major General Nathaniel P. Banks. From August through November, Babcock worked again on improving the fortifications surrounding Washington, responding to increased apprehension the Union capital was vulnerable to attack and capture by the Confederate Army.

=== Peninsula campaign ===
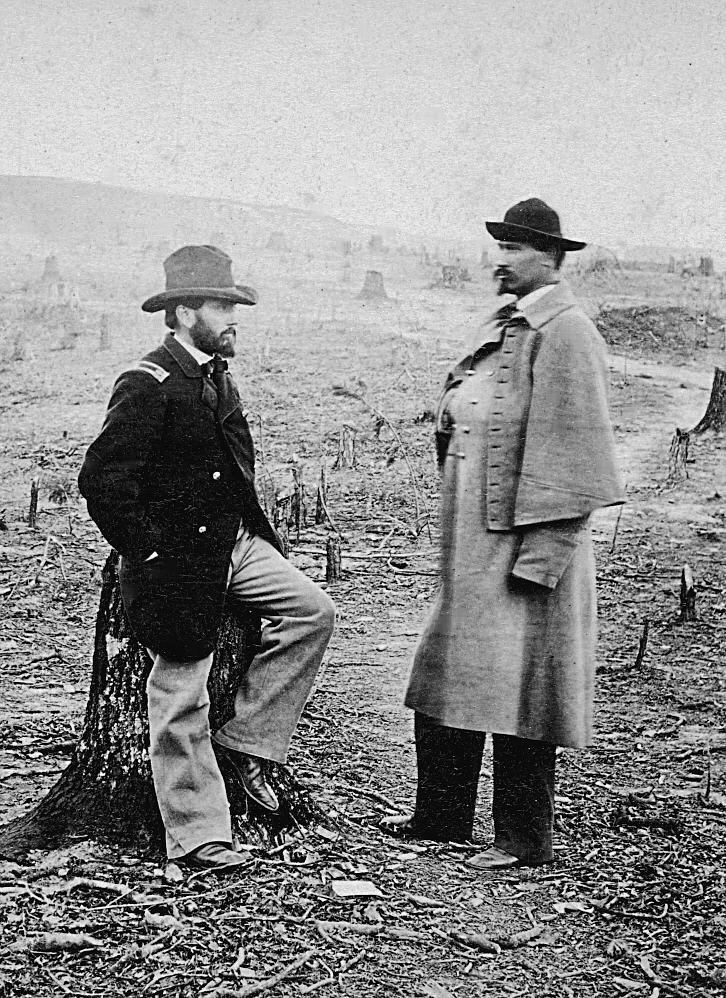
Orville E. Babcock (left) and Orlando M. Poe (right), Union Engineers in Ft. Sander's salient. Photograph by Barnard, 1863–1864.

On November 17, 1861, Babcock was promoted to First Lieutenant, Corps of Engineers, and a week later was assigned to the Army of the Potomac. During the months of February and March 1862, while General Banks moved to Winchester, Virginia, Babcock set up military fortifications at Harper's Ferry and guarded pontoon bridges crossing the Potomac River. During the Peninsula Campaign, Babcock served bravely at the Siege of Yorktown with the Army of the Potomac's Engineer Battalion and was brevetted as a captain to rank from May 4, 1862. For the next seven months, Babcock built bridges, roads, and field works. For his service, in November 1862, Babcock was promoted to Chief Engineer of the Left Grand Division of the Army of the Potomac.

In December 1862, during the Battle of Fredericksburg, Babcock served on Brigadier General William B. Franklin's engineering staff.

=== Vicksburg, Blue Springs, Campbell's Station ===
On January 1, 1863, Babcock was promoted to permanent captain and brevet lieutenant colonel and was named the Assistant Inspector General of the VI Corps until February 6, when he was named the Assistant Inspector General and Chief Engineer of the IX Corps. As Chief Engineer of the IX Corps, Babcock surveyed and projected the defensive fortifications at Louisville and Central Kentucky. Moving westward to help secure the Mississippi River from Confederate control and divide the Confederacy in two, Babcock fought with the IX Corps at the Battle of Vicksburg and the Battle of Blue Springs, and the Battle of Campbell's Station.

=== Knoxville campaign ===
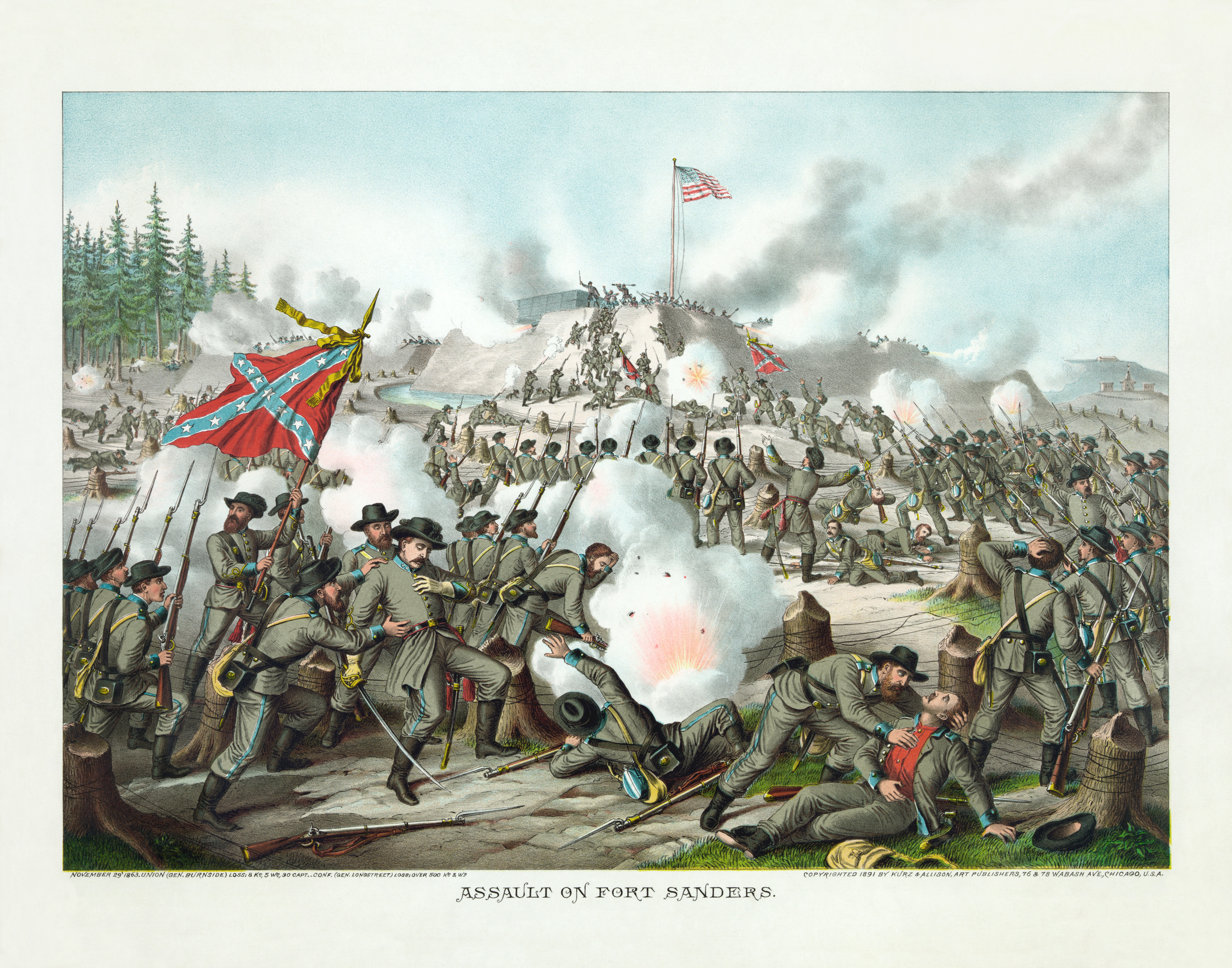
Battle of Fort Sanders

Babcock was part of XXIII Corps, and served under Union engineer Captain Orlando M. Poe. Poe and Union engineers, including Babcock, built several fortifications in the form of bastioned earthworks near Knoxville. One was Fort Sanders, just west of downtown Knoxville across a creek valley. It was named for Brig. Gen. William P. Sanders, mortally wounded in a skirmish outside Knoxville on November 18, 1863. The fort, had an innovative design, and was a salient in the line of earthworks that surrounded three sides of the city, rose 70 feet (21 m) above the surrounding plateau and was protected by a ditch 12 feet (3.7 m) wide and 8 feet (2.4 m) deep. An almost insurmountable vertical wall rose15 feet (4.6 m) above the ditch, slippery and frozen. Inside the fort were 12 cannons and 440 men of the 79th New York Infantry. In front of the ditch, telegraph wires were strung at knee height across tree stumps, possibly the first use of such wire entanglements in the Civil War, to entangle Confederate soldiers who would assault the fort.

The Battle of Fort Sanders was brutal by 19th Century standards. The Confederates moved to within 120–150 yards of the salient during the night of freezing rain and snow and waited for the order to attack. Entangled by the telegraph wire, Confederate soldiers were shot by Union soldiers atop the wall. After crossing the ditch, the Confederates were unable to dig footholds. Men climbed upon each other's shoulders to attempt to reach the top of the wall. Union soldiers rained fire into the attackers, including musketry, canister, and artillery shells were thrown like hand grenades. A succession of color bearers was shot down as they planted their flags on the fort. For a brief time, three flags reached the top, those of the 16th Georgia, 13th Mississippi, and 17th Mississippi. After 40 minutes of battle, the Confederates broke and retreated. The battle ended in a lopsided Union victory, giving Babcock notoriety.

After fighting in the Knoxville Campaign at the Battle of Fort Sanders, Babcock became the Chief Engineer of the Department of the Ohio and was promoted to brevet major on November 29, 1863.

=== Overland Campaign ===
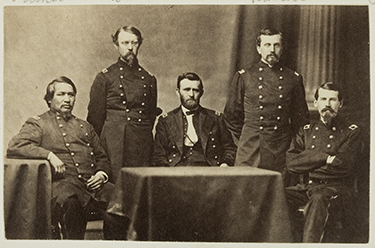
Lieut. Gen. Ulysses S. Grant and Staff: Ulysses S. Grant (at center table), Orville E. Babcock (right)

Babcock was promoted to lieutenant colonel in the regular army on March 29, 1864, and became the aide-de-camp to Lieutenant General Ulysses S. Grant participating in Overland Campaign against General Robert E. Lee and the Confederate Army of Northern Virginia. Babcock served in the Battle of the Wilderness, the Battle of Spotsylvania Court House, and the Battle of Cold Harbor. For his gallant service at the Battle of the Wilderness, Babcock was appointed brevet lieutenant colonel, U.S. Volunteers, to rank from May 6, 1864. On August 9, 1864, Babcock, while stationed at Union headquarters in City Point, was wounded in the hand after Confederate spies had blown up an ammunition barge moored below the city's bluffs. As Grant's aide-de-camp, Babcock ran dispatches between Grant and Major General William T. Sherman during Sherman's March to the Sea campaign.

=== Appomattox: Lee surrenders to Grant ===
On April 9, 1865, after being defeated at the Battle of Appomattox, Commanding Confederate General Robert E. Lee formally surrendered his Army of Northern Virginia to Ulysses S. Grant. Babcock personally chose the site of surrender at the McLean House, personally escorted Lee to the meeting, and witnessed Grant and Lee discussing and signing the surrender terms.

For his meritorious contributions in the Civil War, Babcock was appointed brevet colonel, to rank from March 13, 1865. On July 17, 1866, President Andrew Johnson nominated Babcock for brevet brigadier general in the regular army, to rank from March 13, 1865, and the United States Senate confirmed the appointment on July 23, 1866.

== Reconstruction ==
=== Final promotions, marriage, and family ===
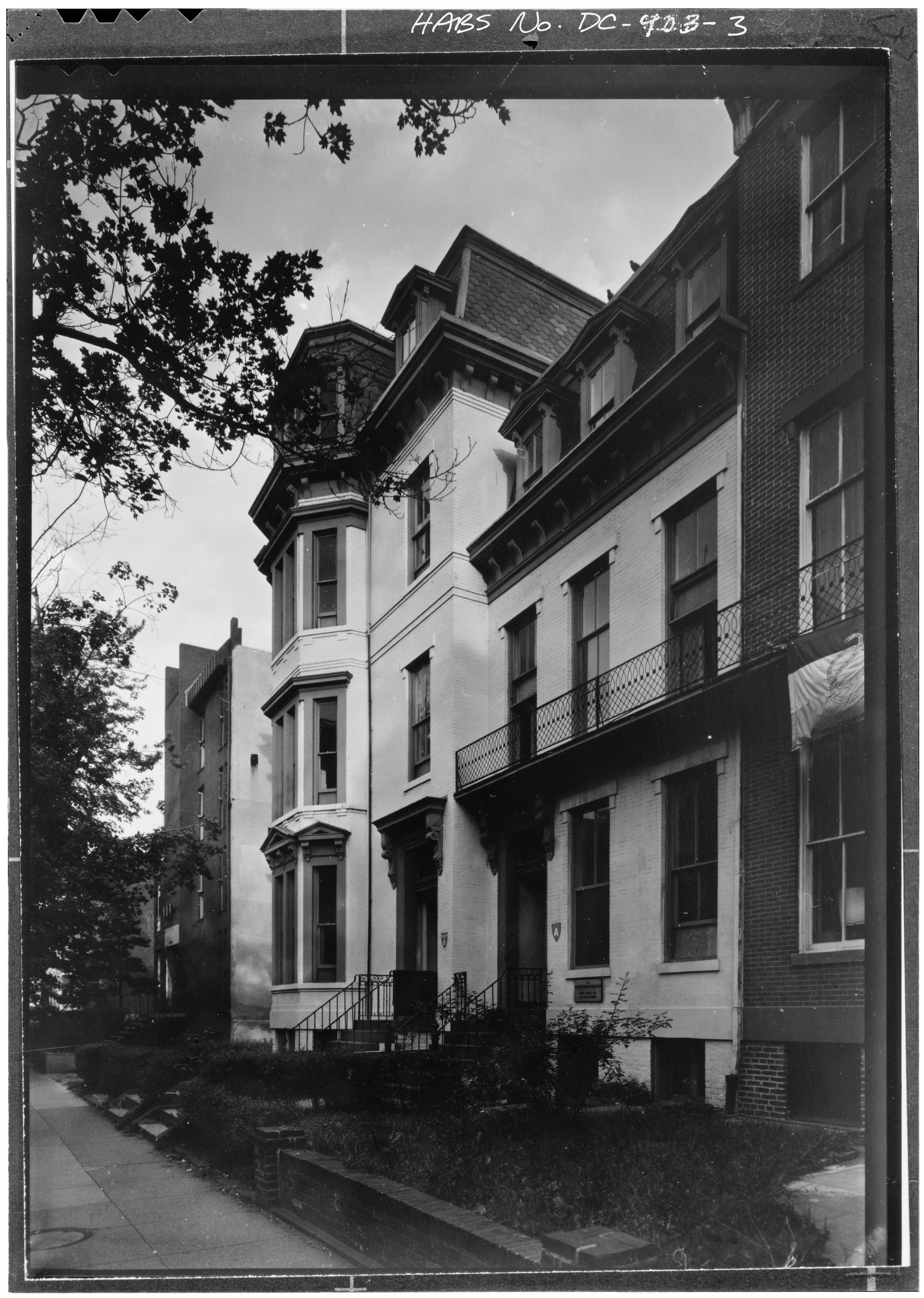
General Babcock's house in Washington D.C.

After the War, Babcock remained on Grant's staff throughout America's turbulent Reconstruction Period. On July 25, 1866, Babcock then was commissioned colonel of volunteers and aide-de-camp for the General-in-Chief of the Army, Ulysses S. Grant. On March 21, 1867, Babcock received a Regular Army commission as a major in the Corps of Engineers.

On November 6, 1866, Babcock married Anne Eliza Cambell in Galena, Illinois. Their marriage produced four children: Campbell E. Babcock, Orville E. Babcock, Jr., Adolph B. Babcock, and Benjamin Babcock. Benjamin died during infancy. Babcock moved to Washington D.C. to serve as Grant's military aide, and remained to serve in the White House after Grant became president.

=== Report on Military Posts (1866) ===
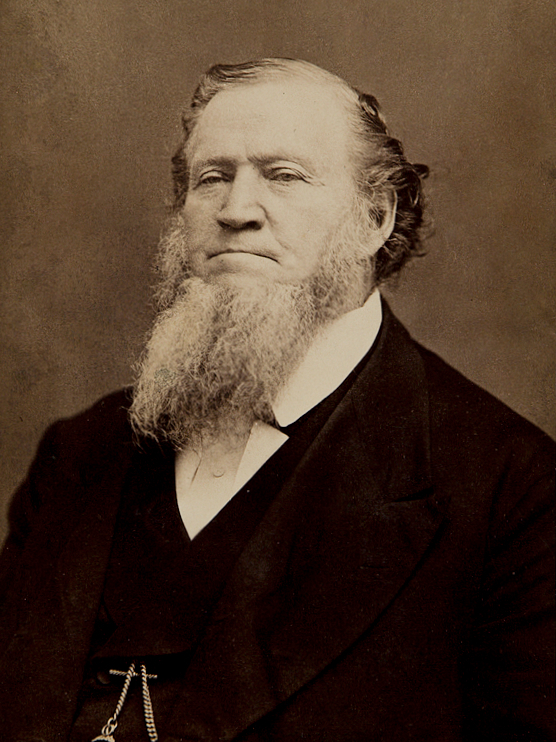
General Babcock confronted Mormon leader Brigham Young over polygamy in Utah.

On April 17, 1866, Babcock was ordered by Commanding General Grant to inspect military posts in the West. Babcock traveled to Saint Louis and met General Sherman. The main goal for Babcock by Sherman was to meet and talk with Brigham Young, leader of the Mormons in Utah, and find out Young's view on polygamy. The sect of the Mormons, at this time, was viewed as a military threat to the United States. On May 2, Babcock left Saint Louis and traveled to Fort Leavenworth, arriving there on May 10. This was the first of a series of military posts Babcock visited in the West. Babcock arrived in Salt Lake City on June 19. In talking with Young, Babcock said Young believed the Morrill Act of 1863, banning polygamy, was unconstitutional. Young said, "the Mormons would never have had more than one wife had not God revealed it to them that it was his wish." Babcock said Young may not have been sincere. The last military post that Babcock visited was San Francisco, arriving there on August 15.

General Babcock's western traveling itinerary was extensive. Babcock traveled to the following places: Saint Louis, Fort Leavenworth, Fort Kearny, Fort McPherson, Fort Sedgwick, Camp Wardwell, Denver, Camp Collins, Big Laramie and North Platte, Fort Halleck. Fort Bridger, (Mormons) Salt Lake City, Utah, Camp Douglas, Fort Boise, Walla-Walla, Camp Lapwal, Dalles, Fort Vancouver, Puget Sound, San Juan, Port Townsend, Fort Steilacoom, and San Francisco.

Secretary of War Edwin Stanton submitted Babcock's report to the House of Representatives on Jan 3, 1867. Schuyler Colfax was the Speaker of the House.

On Mormons:

"The attempt to enforce this law of 1863 has been a failure, and I think will be, not because the people oppose the courts, but the fanatical views of the people render such failures almost certain. The law makes it a crime to take more than one wife. Before the offender can be tried he must be indicted before a jury of the land. The jury of necessity is entirely or mostly of Mormons." Babcock (1866) Military Posts

In 1871, President Ulysses S. Grant rounded up and prosecuted Mormons in Utah, including Brigham Young, over polygamy. In 1874, President Grant signed into law the Poland Act, that limited Mormons to serve on juries.

On Indians:

"In my opinion, the disposition of the troops along this station route is very faulty, partly on account of bad selection of posts, and the idea that to protect a road, the troops must be on the road itself. The distance between these stations is so great that Indians can come upon the road and destroy trains, ranches, stages, and murder the people, and be off before the garrison, eighty or one hundred miles off, can possibly hear of it. It is my opinion that the military posts should be in the Indian country, here the Indian can be watched closely ; and if he makes preparations to take the war path, the commanding officer can prevent his moving, or at least destroy his women and children, and drive off his stock. This will be a difficult question as long as the care of the Indian is divided. When the Indian is peaceful, the Indian agent is responsible; when he has become exasperated by abuse, and cheated out of his small allowance, the army is responsible. For economy and safety, the Indian department or War Department should be responsible for the behaviour of the government's ward during peace and war. Until such is the case, robberies, murders, destruction of trains and ranches, will continue until the superior race has exterminated the other." Babcock (1866) Military Posts

=== Report on South (1867) ===
In mid-April 1867, Grant dispatched Babcock and Horace Porter, another member of his staff, to report on the progress of Southern Reconstruction. Babcock and Porter were optimistic about the plight of blacks who had embraced citizenship saying the "negro is learning very fast. They will soon be the best-educated class in the South if they continue at their present rate of progress." However, Babcock discovered and informed Grant of a white supremacist insurgency using Confederate symbolism that was developing to intimidate African Americans, saying that in Georgia the "police in most of the cities are in a grey uniform, the real confederate uniform."

== President Grant's personal secretary (1869–1876) ==
In 1868, Ulysses S. Grant was elected the 18th President of the United States. In 1869, the 33-year-old Babcock was militarily assigned, rather than publicly appointed, Grant's personal secretary, to bypass Congressional approval. As one of a few men who had daily access to Grant in the White House, and one who had been close to Grant during the war, Babcock had unprecedented power and influence, entrusted by Grant, which extended directly and indirectly into many agencies and departments. His influence was so great that when cabinet positions and other appointments became available, Grant often acted on Babcock's recommendations. Suspected of using that influence for his own ends, Babcock was often at odds with reformers and opponents of corruption, including Secretary of State Hamilton Fish, Secretary of the Treasury Benjamin Bristow, and U.S. Attorney General Edwards Pierrepont, all who desired to save Grant's reputation from scandal. While Grant admired Babcock for his Civil War service, Babcock's relative youth and ambitious nature led Grant's critics to consider him the Iago of the Grant administration.

=== Gatekeeper to Grant ===
While serving in the White House, Babcock retained his position in the U.S. Army, an arrangement made between Grant and his successor as head of the Army, William T. Sherman. Babcock did not require Senate confirmation for his appointment and retained his military salary, which made it difficult for Congress to exercise oversight when Babcock became the subject of controversy and scandal. Babcock's duties included involvement in patronage matters, finding negative information on critics of the Grant administration, and feeding political stories to pro-Grant newspapers. Babcock was part of a team of Grant's personal secretaries. Including Babcock, were Grant's brother-in-law Frederick Dent, Horace Porter, and Robert Douglas, the son of former presidential candidate and Senator, Stephen A. Douglas. Dent greeted White House guests, deciding who would see Grant or one of his Cabinet secretaries.

Babcock's White House office was in a second-floor anteroom that led to President Grant's private office, a circumstance that caused many to resent Babcock's insider role, and created a negative perception among contemporaries that overrode Babcock's positive attributes. Babcock also opened and answered most of Grant's personal letters, and historian Allan Nevins argued that Babcock's position was as at least as important as the Cabinet secretaries, and more powerful than most.

=== Santo Domingo ===
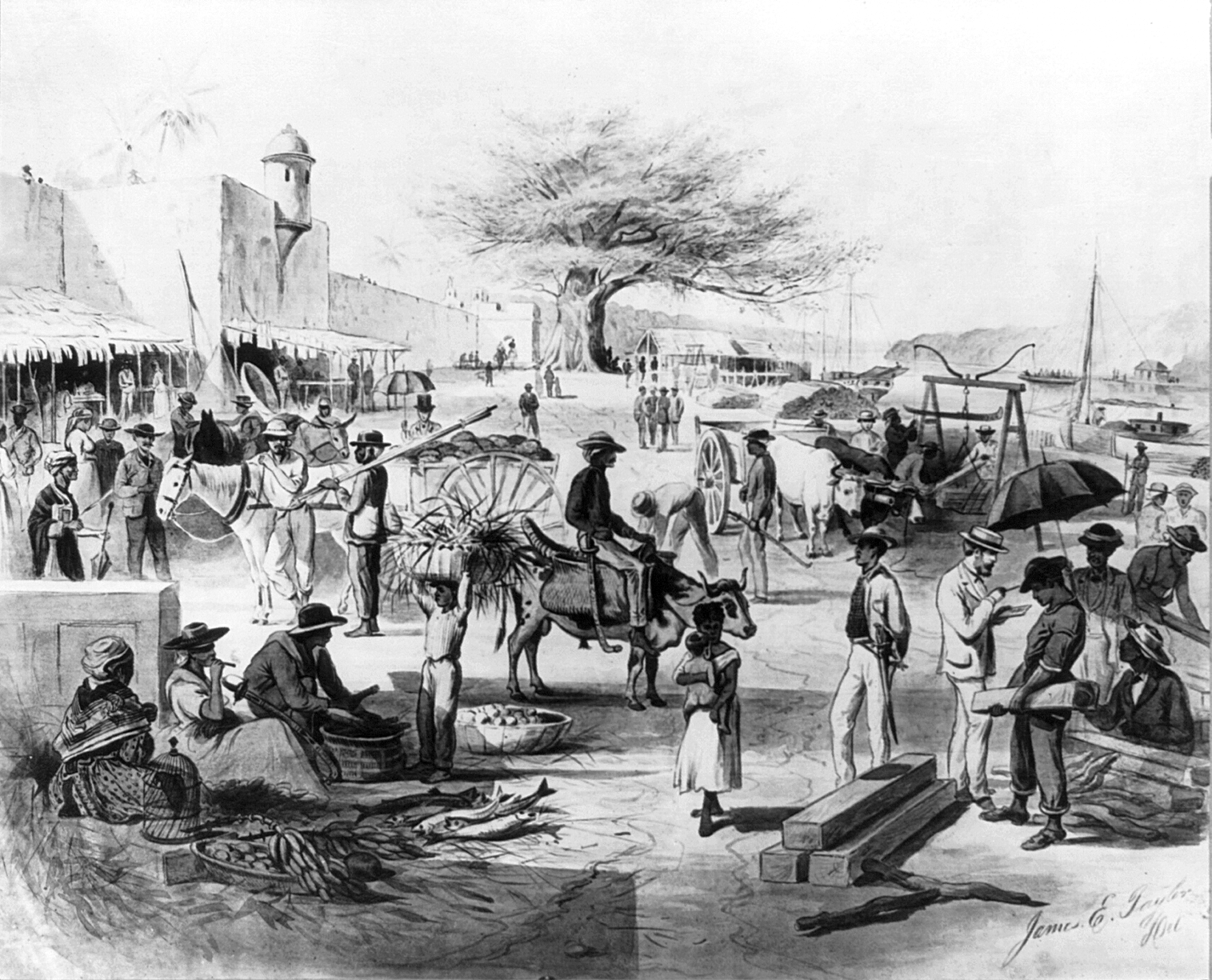
Santo Domingo City 1871

During the summer of 1869, Grant dispatched Babcock, Grant's special agent, to the mostly mixed-race and white, Spanish-speaking Caribbean island country of the Dominican Republic (18,655 mi^{2}), then commonly called Santo Domingo. At this time, federal land speculation was not uncommon, as Congress had in March 1867 purchased Alaska (663,300 mi^{2}) from the Russian Empire. Like his predecessor Andrew Johnson, Grant received inducements from speculators interested in Caribbean expansion, particularly for Haiti and the Dominican Republic. Speculators William L. Cazneau and Joseph W. Fabens formed the Santo Domingo Company in New York to attract financial supporters for annexing the Dominican Republic. Grant's Secretary of State Hamilton Fish, was doubtful concerning Dominican annexation, believing the country was politically unstable, and became suspicious when Fabens asked him to support a plan of American annexation of the Dominican Republic. Grant desired to investigate the island and find out whether the people wanted annexation. After two other candidates were excluded, Grant and Fish agreed to send Babcock on a secret reconnaissance mission to the Dominican Republic.

Although Babcock was not fluent in Spanish and did not have extensive knowledge of the West Indies, he was well qualified at gathering information, having done a Report on Military Posts (1866) and a Report on the South (1867). Babcock's official instructions, signed by Fish, were to gather knowledge of local conditions, but without diplomatic status. Grant, however, wanted Babcock to find out Santo Domingo President Buenaventura Báez's condition to purchase the island. In addition, he was to investigate the nation's agriculture and mineral wealth, as well as determine whether the government was stable and whether the people desired annexation. He was also instructed to find out about the country's economy, including the interest rate on the national debt and the strength of the Dominican currency. Although Grant gave Babcock verbal orders to find out the terms for Dominican annexation, Fish had not authorized Babcock to formally negotiate an agreement. This caused doubt about Babcock's legal diplomatic authority, and later a rift in Grant's own Cabinet.

==== Visited island ====
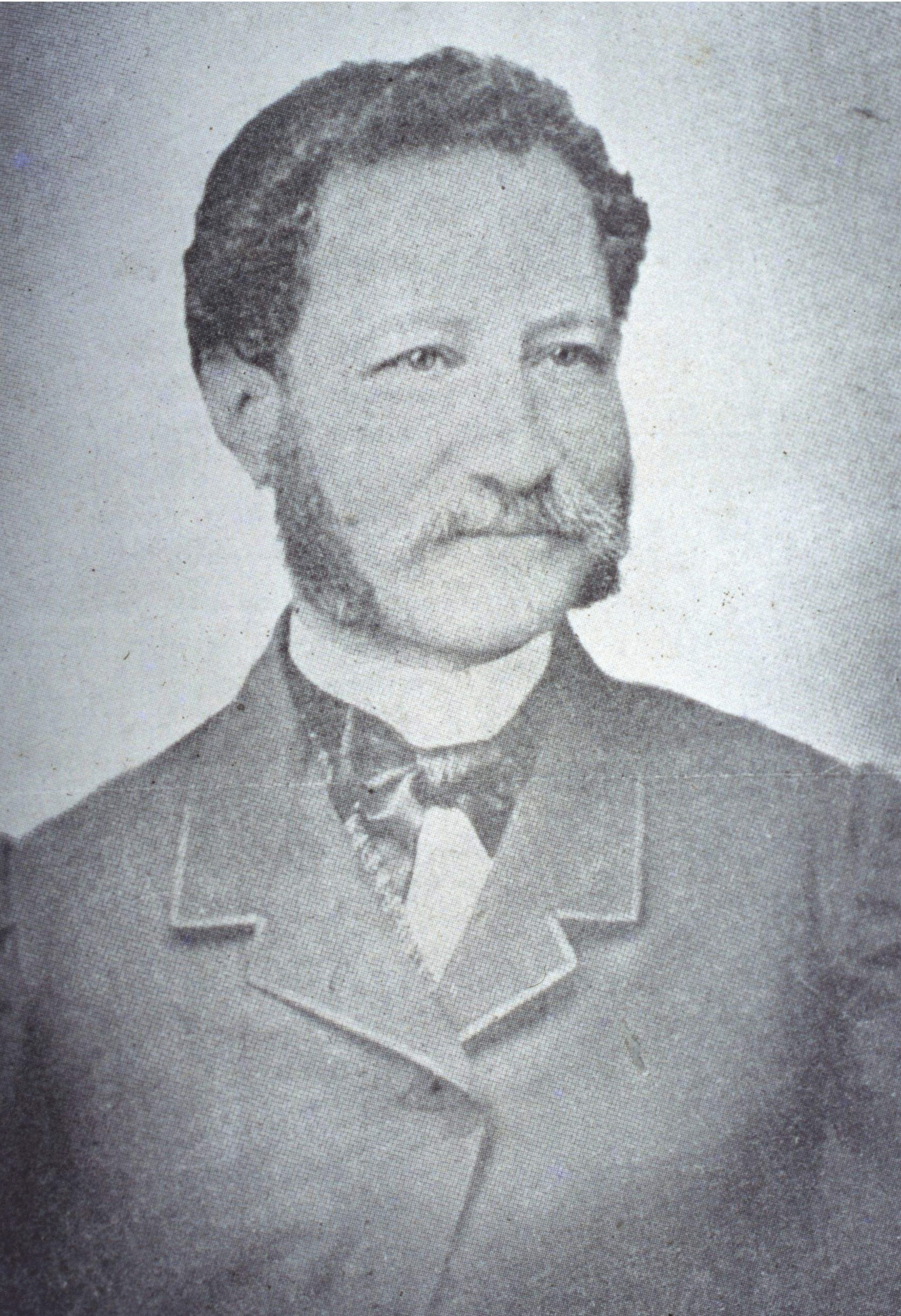
President Báez

Babcock boarded the steamship Tybee in New York and departed for the Dominican Republic on July 17, 1869. He was accompanied by Fabens and annexation supporter California Republican Senator Cornelius Cole. On the voyage the Tybee stopped at Samaná Bay and observed there was a "splendid coal station" on the island. The indigenous people were upset over a recent raid by the rebel Haitian warship Telégrafo. Noting the soil to be fertile, Babcock believed the Dominican Republic could feed 4 million people. Babcock, however, said the people of the Dominican Republic were "indolent and ignorant." Babcock's view, however, of the mixed-race white people, did not impede his vision of Santo Domingo's inclusion by the United States. Babcock was a Reconstruction man, who was "nicely color-blind" to opportunism, in the post-Civil War world.

Babcock's next visited Santo Domingo City but found that President Buenaventura Báez was not there. Babcock was entertained by Cazneau and his wife at their plantation house. After his stay in Santo Domingo City, Babcock reboarded the Tybee and voyaged to Azua, 60 miles away, where President Báez was staying. Babcock recorded that Báez was in favor of friendly relations with the United States. Nothing, however, was talked about annexation, until Babcock and Báez returned to Santo Domingo City.

==== Treaty negotiations ====
With doubtful diplomatic authorization, Babcock entered negotiations with Báez for annexation on August 7, with Cazneau serving as Babcock's interpreter. Babcock was informed of a large loan with unfavorable terms that the Dominican government had taken from financier Edward Herzberg Hartmont. With annexation, the United States would be burdened by this loan, meaning this debt could hinder ratification in the Senate. Babcock believed the loan was a backhanded way by the British to take over the Dominican Gulf, presuming the Dominican government failed to pay it back. Babcock and Báez began significant negotiations in the second week of August and asked Cazneau and Fabens for assistance. Babcock told Báez he was a representative of President Grant, and he was called to the Dominican Republic to discuss a union of the two republics. Báez said he believed annexation would stabilize the country that he believed had gone backward and asked Babcock to draw up a written plan for annexation.

By September 1869, Babcock and Cazneau drew up plans for annexation and submitted them to Báez, who generally approved. According to the drafts, Samaná Bay would be sold to the United States for $2 million or the whole country would be annexed to the United States after the U.S. paid off the Dominican Republic's national debt of $1.5 million. Báez told Babcock that before returning to Santo Domingo with a formal treaty, he should be assured by a sufficient number of Senators that they would ratify it. Babcock replied that President Grant, "would not enter into any treaty without weighing the matter well, and feeling assured that it would be approved." Babcock was a supporter of Congressional Reconstruction and he saw Santo Domingo as a source of new opportunities in a post-war world. Babcock asked Báez to put in writing an annexation proposal he could transmit to Grant. After Báez agreed to do so, Gautier prepared a formal memorandum to be sent back to Washington.

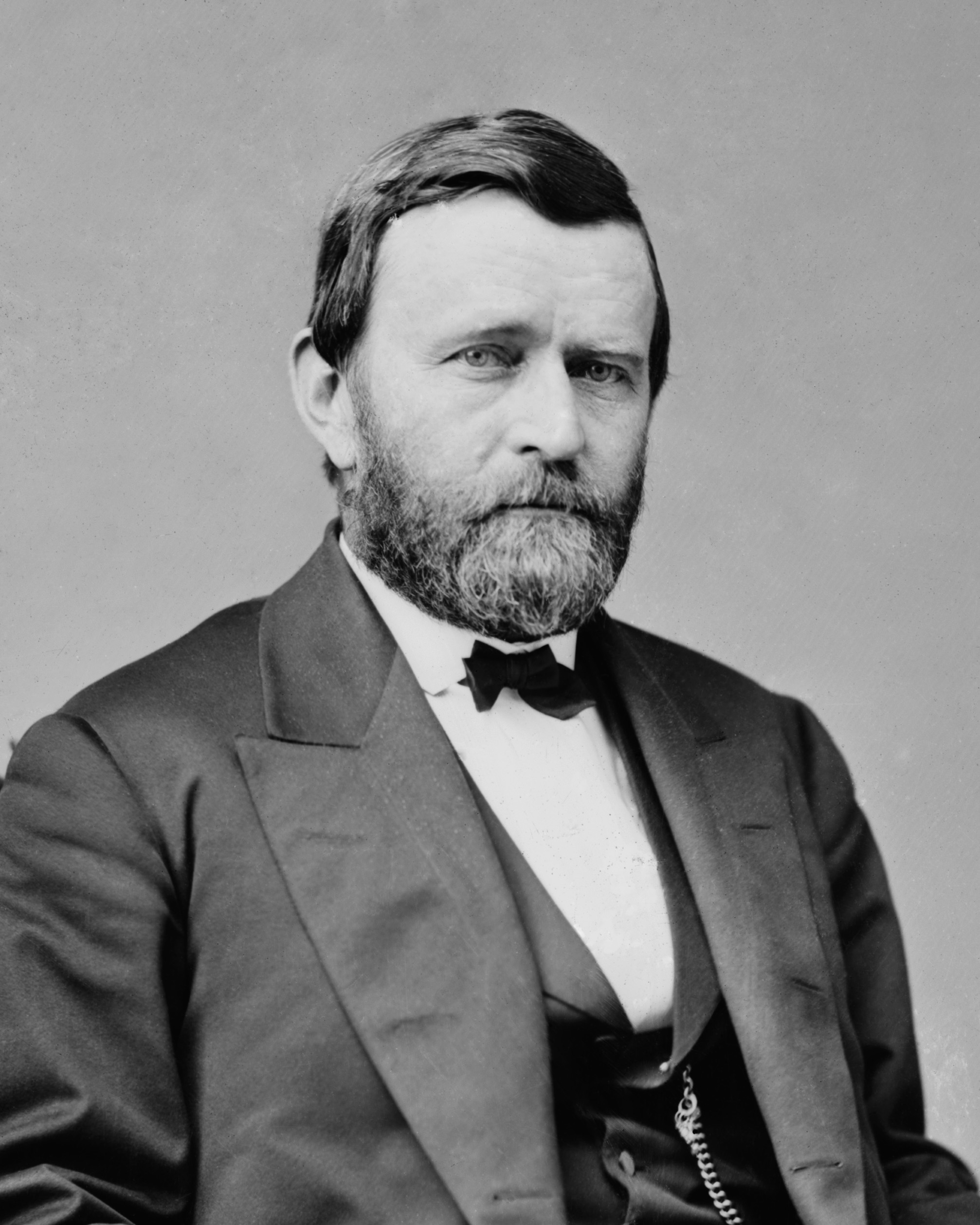
President Grant Brady 1870

When Babcock returned to the White House with a draft of a treaty, Fish and Secretary of Interior Jacob D. Cox were alarmed, since Babcock had no official standing. Fish told Cox "Babcock is back...I pledge you my word he had no more diplomatic authority than any other casual visitor to the island." At the next cabinet meeting Babcock was there in person and Grant told his silenced cabinet that Babcock was back and that he (Grant) approved of the treaty. Cox spoke up and said, "But Mr. President, has it been settled, then, that we want to annex Santo Domingo ?" Grant was embarrassed and began puffing on his cigar, while the other cabinet members said nothing, Cox's question remained unanswered. Fish threatened to resign over the matter, but Grant convinced him to stay on the administration, telling Fish he would not go around him again and he needed Fish's guidance and support. Fish agreed to remain on the cabinet, although he hoped Grant would drop the Santo Domingo annexation treaty.

Grant did not drop the treaty, believing annexation would help alleviate violent suppression of African Americans in the Southern states by providing in Santo Domingo a place where they could live and work undisturbed. Fish sent Babcock back to the Dominican Republic on November 18, accompanied by Major General Rufus Ingalls, a high-ranking Quartermaster officer. This time, Babcock had official State Department status and instructions to draw up two formal treaties, which were signed on November 29, 1869. Grant, however, kept the treaties secret from Congress and the public, until mid-January 1870. After the earnest public discussion, the treaties were formally submitted to Congress in March, whereupon Senators joined in the debate.

==== Failed to pass Senate ====
Senator Charles Sumner strongly opposed the annexation treaties objecting to Babcock's secret negotiations, his use of naval power, and desiring to keep Santo Domingo an autonomous nation rather than annexation and potential statehood as Grant had proposed. The people of Santo Domingo overwhelmingly desired annexation voting 15,169 to 11 in its favor, according to a plebiscite held by Báez. Senate Republicans led by Sumner split the party over the treaty while Senators loyal to Grant supported the treaty and admonished Babcock. The treaties however failed to pass the Senate causing continued bitterness and hostility between Grant and Sumner, both stubbornly trying to control the Republican Party. Although Babcock was suspected of being given investment land on Samaná Bay, a Congressional investigation found no conclusive evidence that Babcock would financially gain from the country's annexation. Babcock in the minority report was criticized for acquiescing in the imprisonment of Davis Hatch, an American abroad, who was an open critic of Báez.

=== Corruption ===
==== Gold corner (1869) ====
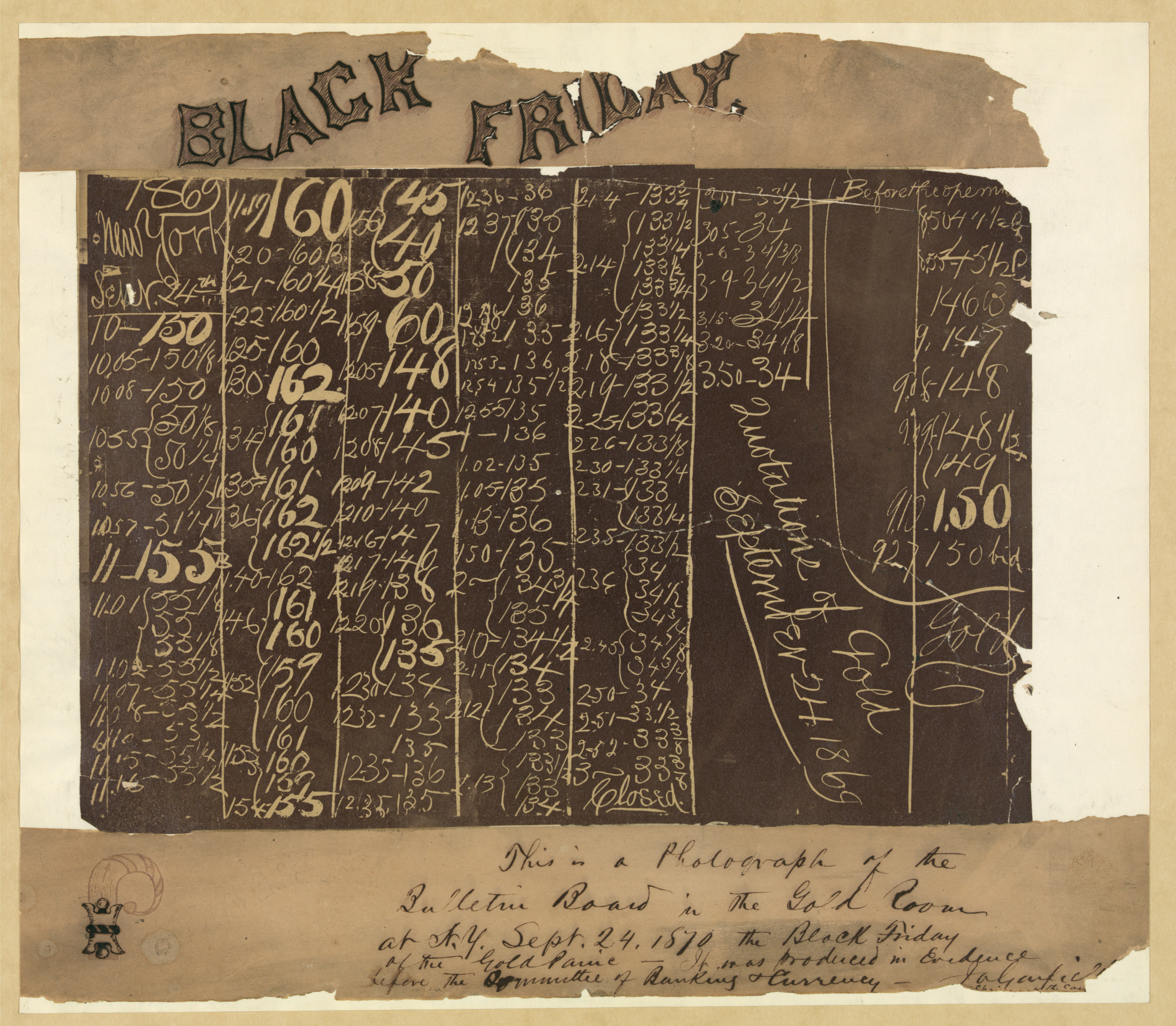
Black Friday September 24, 1869

In 1869, Babcock invested money in Jay Gould's Gold Ring, a scam by wealthy New York tycoons Jay Gould and James Fisk to profit by cornering the market on gold. Starting in late April, Secretary of the Treasury George S. Boutwell had regulated the price of gold by monthly sales from the Treasury in exchange for greenbacks. As part of the Gold Ring's effort, Gould convinced Grant not to increase the Treasury's September gold sale, helping make it scarce and inflating the price. Gould and Fisk then set up a buying operation, the New York Gold Room, where traders in their employ purchased as much gold as they could acquire, which artificially drove up the price. When Grant became aware of the full extent of the attempt to corner the market in late September 1869, he ordered the release of $4,500,000 in Treasury gold, which caused the price to collapse. Gould and Fisk were thwarted but at the expense of a decline in the stock market and the overall economy. Babcock and other individuals who secretly invested with him lost $40,000 (about $750,000 in 2018). To satisfy his creditors, Babcock had to sign a trust deed on his property, which named Asa Bird Gardiner as trustee. The extent of Babcock's involvement was not revealed to Grant until 1876 when his complicity in the Gold Ring was uncovered during the investigation of his involvement in the Whiskey Ring.

==== New York Customs House (1872) ====
In 1872, Babcock and Horace Porter, Grant's other military private secretary, were alleged to have taken payoffs from George K. Leet, a member of Grant's staff during the war. Leet had moved to New York City, where he worked under successive Collectors of the Port of New York Moses H. Grinnell and Thomas Murphy as the operator of a scheme that enabled the New York Customs House to charge exorbitant fees for storing goods in private warehouses until the receivers took possession. Congress investigated, and Grant requested Murphy's resignation and Leet's firing. Murphy's replacement, Chester A. Arthur, implemented reforms directed by Secretary of Treasury George S. Boutwell, including stricter record-keeping and an end to private storage.

==== Whiskey Ring (1875–1876) ====
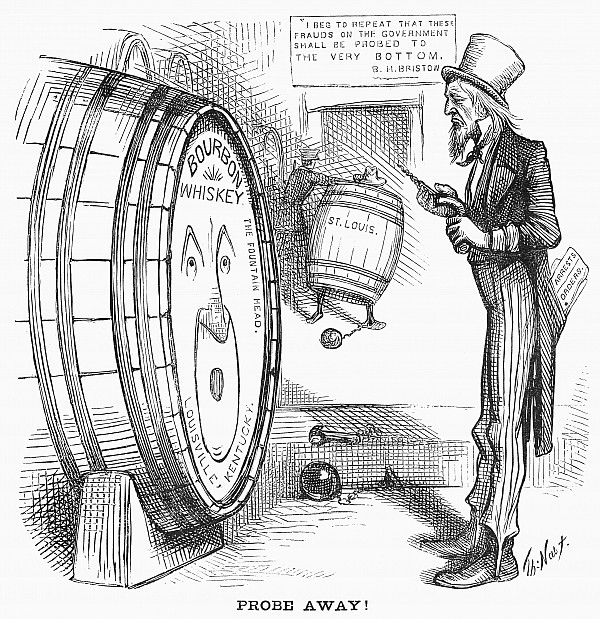
Thomas Nast cartoon depicting the Whiskey Ring, published in Harper's Weekly (March, 1876)

Dating back to the Presidency of Abraham Lincoln it was common for distillers and corrupt Internal Revenue agents to make false whiskey production reports and pocket unpaid tax revenue. However, during the early 1870s, the corruption became more organized by distillers, who used the illegally obtained money for bribery and illegal election financing, to the point where every agent in St. Louis was involved in corruption. This organized network, known as the Whiskey Ring, extended nationally and involved "the printing, selling, and approving of forged federal revenue stamps on bottled whiskey."

In June 1874, President Grant appointed Benjamin Bristow as Secretary of Treasury, with the authority to investigate the Whiskey Ring and prosecute wrongdoers. Bristow, a Kentuckian, and Union Army veteran was known for his honesty and integrity and had served as the nation's first Solicitor General, also appointed by Grant. Bristow immediately discovered whiskey tax evasion among distillers and corrupt officials in the Treasury Department and the Internal Revenue Bureau. Bristow and Bluford Wilson, the Treasury Solicitor obtained Grant's permission to use secret agents appointed from outside the Treasury Department; as a result of the evidence they obtained, on May 10, 1875, Treasury Department agents raided and shut down corrupt distilleries in St. Louis, Chicago, and Milwaukee, seizing company financial records and other files.

Bristow then prosecuted the offenders by working with Grant's newly appointed Attorney General, Edwards Pierrepont, a popular New York reformer who had been involved in shutting down New York City's corrupt Tweed Ring. Information was soon discovered that Babcock was informing ring leader John McDonald in St. Louis of inspections by Bristow's agents, giving them time to hide incriminating evidence before agents arrived. Bristow believed Babcock received cash in exchange for this information, in one instance two five-hundred-dollar bills hidden inside a cigar box. McDonald was indicted in June when Bristow obtained indictments against 350 distillers and government officials.

Grant's anti-corruption team, Bristow and Pierrepont, confronted Babcock over the Whiskey Ring, at the White House.

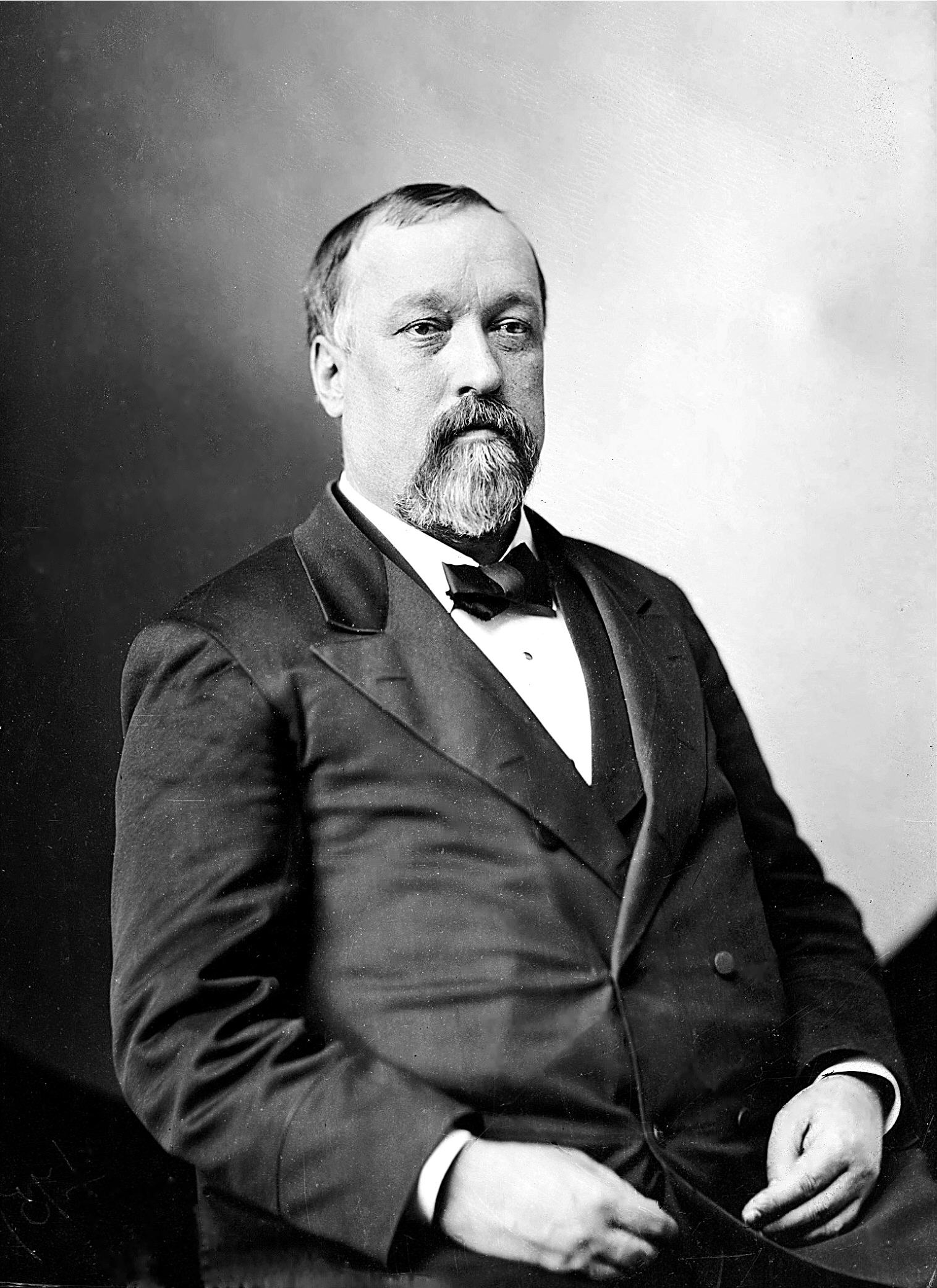
Benjamin Bristow

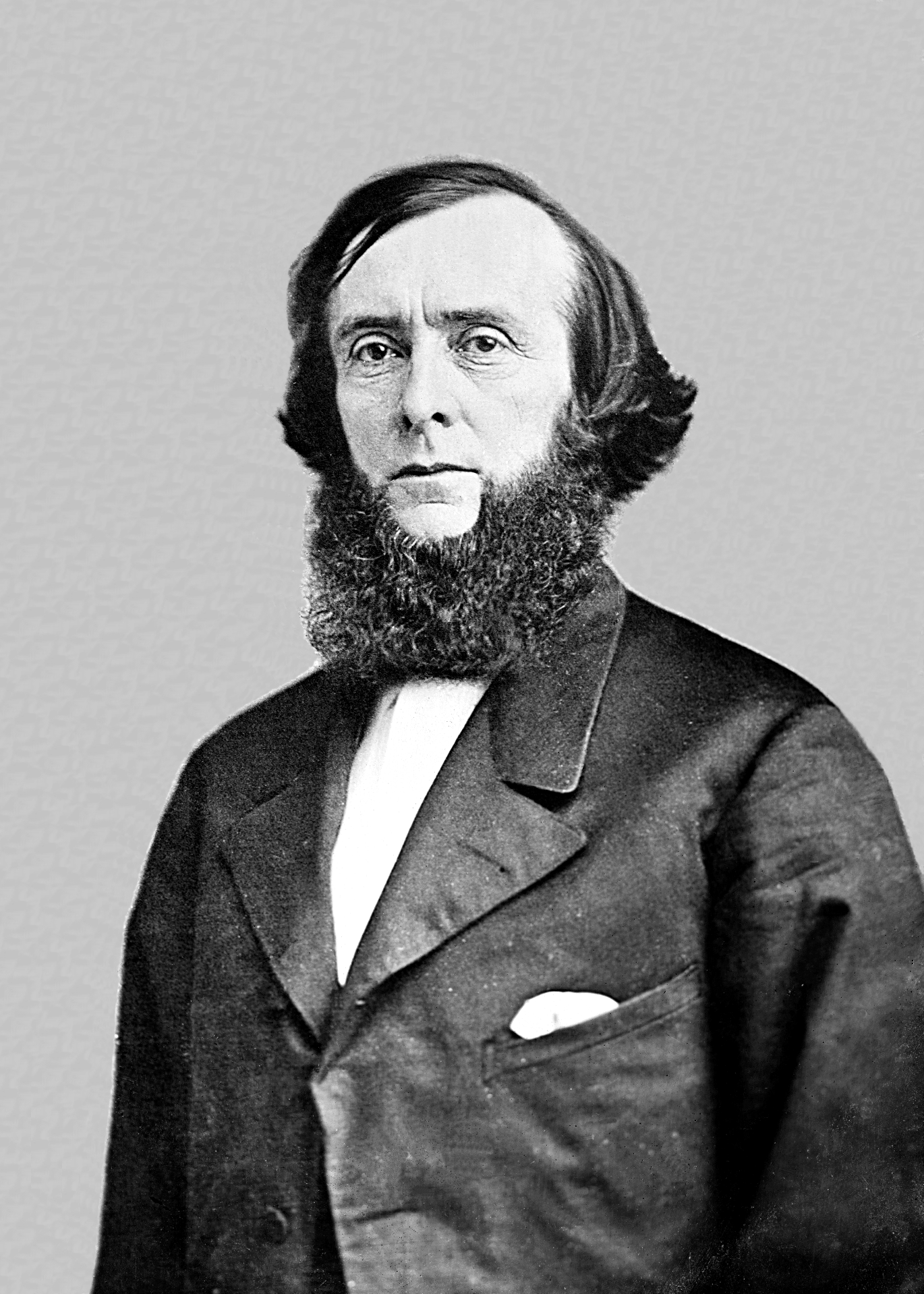
Edwards Pierrepont

In July 1875, Bristow and Pierrepont met Grant, who was vacationing at Long Branch and gave him evidence that Babcock was a member of the ring. Grant told Pierrepont "Let no guilty man escape..." and said if Babcock was guilty then it was the "greatest piece of traitorism to me that a man could possibly practice." In October, Babcock was summoned in front of Grant, Bristow, and Pierrepont at the White House to explain two ambiguous telegrams handwritten by Babcock and signed "Sylph", an apparent code name for Babcock. The first message said, "I have succeeded. They will not go. I will write you." (December 10, 1874) and the second one said, "We have official information that the enemy weakens. Push things." (February 3, 1875) Bristow had shown these messages to Grant at a cabinet meeting the same day. Babcock said something to Grant, unintelligible to Bristow and Pierrepont, and Grant appeared satisfied by Babcock's interpretation of the telegrams.

Pierrepont and Bristow, believing the matter to be crucial, insisted Babcock send a message to his telegraphic correspondent demanding that this individual come to Washington to give his version of the messages. After Babcock seemed to be taking too long, Pierrepont went to check on him and found Babcock writing a warning to revenue agent John A. Joyce, his St. Louis confederate, to be on his guard. Infuriated, Pierrepont grabbed Babcock's pen and dashed through his message yelling "You don't want to send your argument; send the fact, and go there and make your explanation. I do not understand it." Grant, on the other hand, was divided between the loyalty he had for Babcock, and his desire for Bristow and Pierrepont, trustworthy members of his cabinet, to prosecute the Whiskey Ring. Since Babcock had no acceptable explanation for his messages, he was indicted for tax fraud on November 4, 1875.

As an Army officer, on December 2, 1875, Babcock requested of Grant a court-martial, believing that a military tribunal would be favorable to his defense. Grant agreed and saw to it that a pro-Babcock panel was appointed, including Asa Bird Gardiner, who had a clear conflict of interest based on his business dealings with Babcock. Panel member Winfield Scott Hancock pointed out that Babcock was facing identical charges in federal court, and persuaded the court-martial to yield to civilian authorities. On December 8, 1875, U.S. Attorney David Dyer followed Bristow's instructions and set Babcock's St. Louis jury trial for February 1876. When Babcock's trial date came up, Grant decided to testify in Babcock's defense. By this time, Grant said his critics were using Babcock to go after his own presidency. After cabinet members objected to Grant testifying in St. Louis as unseemly for a President, it was settled that Grant would give a deposition at the White House.

===== St. Louis trial =====
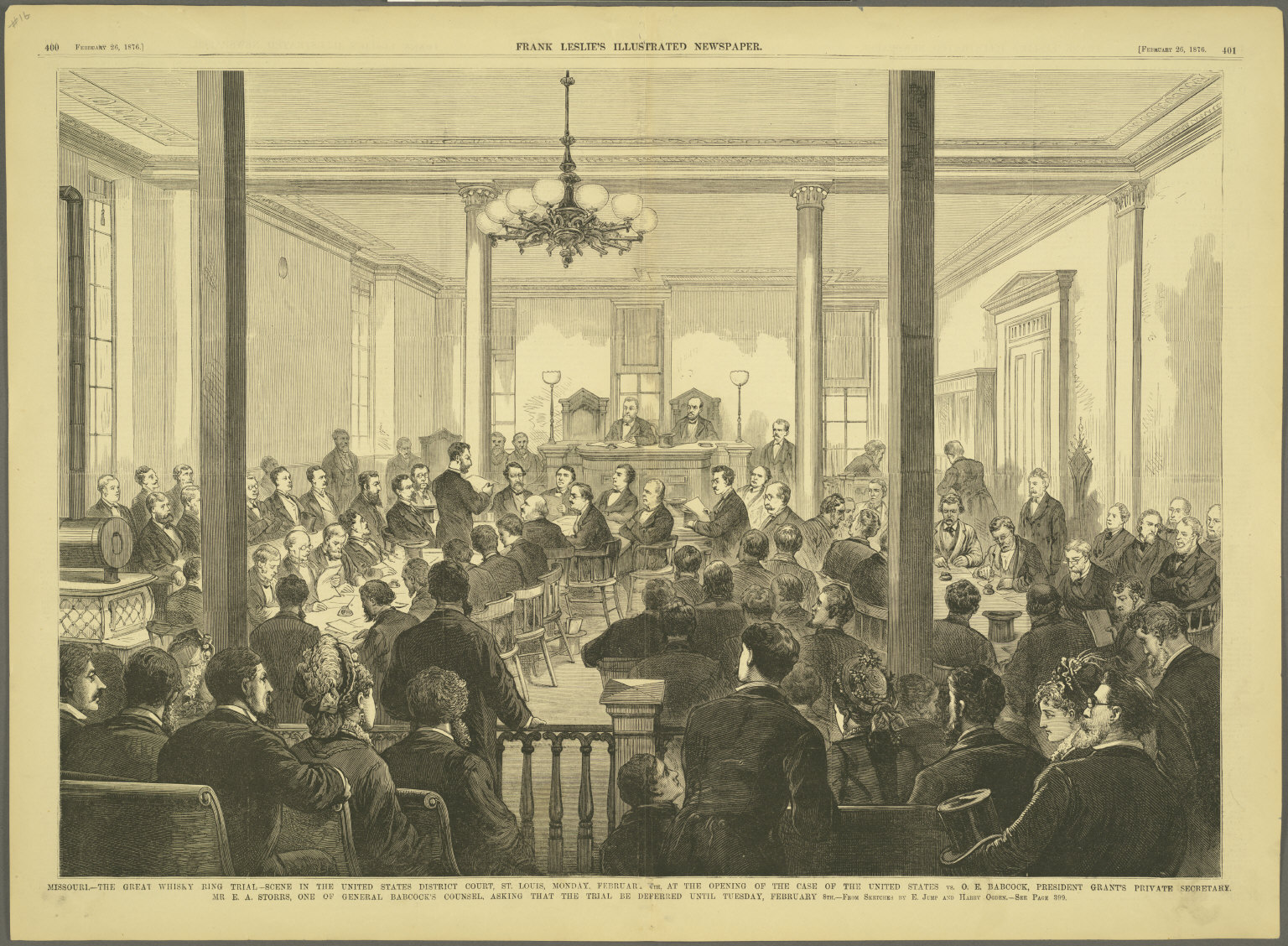
Orville Babcock's trial in St. Louis. Babcock is seen toward the left seated in civilian clothes next to his attorney Emory Storrs standing by the table. Frank Leslie's Illustrated Newspaper (February 26, 1876)

On February 8, 1876, Babcock went on trial, an event that lasted eighteen days. Babcock's defense team was noted for its prowess and included Grant's former Attorney General George Williams, a top criminal defense lawyer, Emory Storrs, and a former appeals judge (New York), John K. Porter. It took place at the U.S. Post Office and Customs House located at 218 North Third Street, and the status of the defendant made the trial a popular and well-attended spectacle. Demand to attend the proceedings was so great that only persons with signed passes and Whiskey Ring defendants were allowed in. Babcock arrived in civilian clothes, including sky-blue pants, a silk hat, and a light jacket. When court was not in session, Babcock stayed at the newly rebuilt Lindell Hotel on Sixth Street and Washington Avenue.

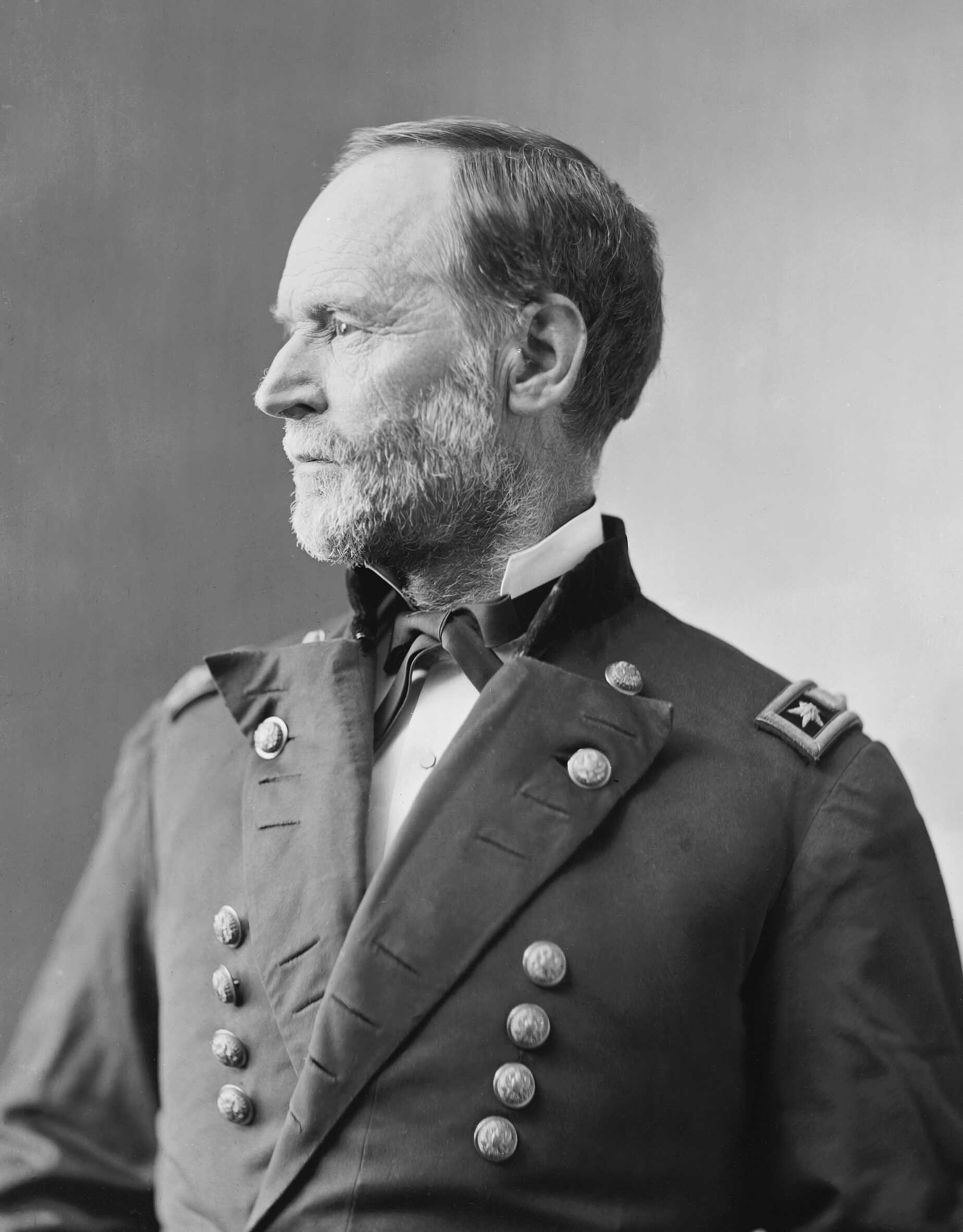
General William T. Sherman testified at Babcock's trial.

Grant's White House deposition took place on February 12; it was notarized by Chief Justice Morrison Waite and witnessed by both Bristow and Pierrepont. In his statement, Grant fully supported the Whiskey Ring prosecutions, but willfully refused to testify against Babcock, despite having been informed by Bristow of Babcock's duplicity. Instead, Grant praised Babcock, saying he had "great confidence" in Babcock's integrity, and that his confidence in Babcock was "unshaken".

On February 17, Babcock's defense counsel read President Grant's deposition to the jury, which severely weakened any chance of Babcock being convicted. The same day, General William T. Sherman testified that Babcock's "character has been very good." Grant's deposition, Sherman's in-person testimony, and the evidence presented by Babcock's shrewd defense counsel led to his acquittal on February 25. A rumor spread that Pierrepont had leaked information to Babcock that aided in his acquittal, but Pierrepont denied this and suggested that Babcock himself had started the rumor. A few months later Grant's appointed anti-corruption team broke up. Pierrepont resigned office on May 21, 1876, and was appointed by Grant United States Minister to the United Kingdom on July 11, 1876. Enmity between Grant and Bristow over Babcock, pressured Bristow to leave office, rather than be fired by Grant. Bristow resigned from Grant's cabinet on June 20, 1876.

===== Return to Washington D.C. =====
When Babcock returned to Washington, he went back to his White House office, as if there had been no trial. Grant's Secretary of State, Hamilton Fish, was furious and pressured Grant to force Babcock to leave, saying that Grant merely had to dismiss Babcock, because as a military officer Babcock was subject to orders and had no recourse. Additionally, Treasury Solicitor Wilson informed Grant that Babcock had been involved with the 1869 plot to corner the gold market. Grant finally dismissed Babcock from the White House and appointed his son Ulysses Jr. in Babcock's place. It was later discovered that Babcock used his Whiskey Ring kickbacks to purchase from Henry Shelton Sanford on Christmas Day, 1874 a home and over 50 acres of grove land near what became the city of Sanford, Florida.

===== Aftermath =====
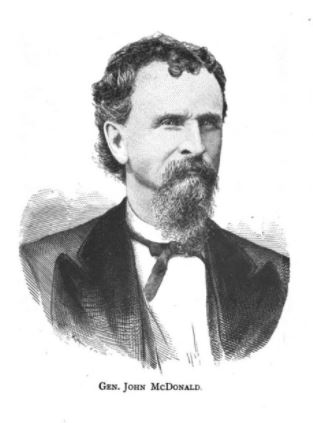
Babcock's nemesis, Gen. John McDonald

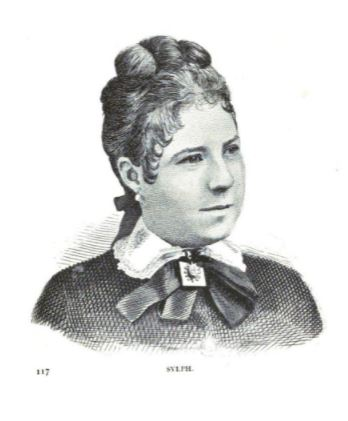
Louise Hawkins, the "Sylph" who captivated Babcock

Another Union officer, General John McDonald, was found guilty of being the Saint Louis Whiskey Ring kingpin and sent to federal prison. McDonald believed Babcock deserved to be in prison with him and in 1880 he published a salacious tell-all book Secrets of the Great Whiskey Ring, in which he claimed that Babcock and Grant were part of the ring. According to historian William McFeely, although there was substantial evidence Babcock was, McDonald gave no evidence to implicate Grant.

McDonald also accused Babcock of adultery and revealed the origin of the "Sylph" signature. According to McDonald, when Babcock had attended the annual St. Louis Fair with John A. Joyce, they saw a very attractive woman while they were walking on 5th Street, whom Babcock nicknamed "Sylph" for her beauty. Although Babcock was married, he reportedly said to Joyce, "She is the most beautiful and bewitching woman I ever saw; for heaven's sake; let us turn the corner and meet her again so that you can give me an introduction.". Later, at Freund's restaurant, Joyce introduced Babcock to the woman, whose name was Louise "Lu" Hawkins, and they developed an intimate relationship. Babcock later used "Sylph" as a code signature in correspondence with Joyce.

==== Safe burglary conspiracy (1876) ====
On April 15, 1876, fifty-one days after his acquittal in the Whiskey Ring trial, Babcock was indicted again, this time for involvement in the Safe Burglary Conspiracy. In 1874, Richard Harrington, an Assistant United States Attorney for Washington, DC attempted to frame Columbus Alexander, leader of the Memorialists, a reform organization critical of D.C. governor Alexander Robey Shepherd's management of the city. Harrington hired dishonest Secret Service agents to break into the U.S. Attorney's safe, using explosives to make it obvious that a burglary had occurred. To entrap Alexander, the conspirators took materials that were supposedly stolen from the safe to his home at night, intending to give them to him and then later arrest him for their possession. Alexander thwarted this effort by refusing to answer the door. At that point, the Secret Service agents arrested two other conspirators who pretended to be the supposed burglars and had them sign false affidavits implicating Alexander in the burglary. The conspiracy collapsed when the Secret Service agents admitted at Alexander's trial that the charges were false, and Alexander was acquitted. The conspiracy was alleged to have included Babcock as the liaison between Harrington and the Secret Service agents because Babcock wanted to silence Alexander, a prominent Grant administration critic. Babcock was exonerated of direct involvement. However, his continued ties to scandal and corruption turned public opinion against him, while he was viewed as a foe of Washington D.C. reform.

== Public buildings and grounds (1873–1877) ==
From March 3, 1873, to March 3, 1877, Babcock served as Washington's Superintendent of Public Buildings and Grounds, a Grant appointment he carried out in addition to serving as Grant's secretary. In this role, Babcock was involved in the beautification of the federal city and improvements to its infrastructure but was also tied to allegations of corruption. The city's territorial governor, Alexander Robey Shepherd, a Grant appointee, operated aggressively when awarding contracts, and Babcock and Shepherd were accused of personally profiting from construction projects within the city limits. Babcock's supervision included construction of the Chain Bridge over the Potomac River and the Anacostia Railroad Bridge. He also supervised the construction of the east wing of the new State, War, and Navy Building. Babcock retained the Superintendent's position after he was dismissed from the White House in 1876, and served until the Grant administration ended.

== Inspector of lighthouses (1877–1884) ==
With Grant's administration scheduled to end on March 4, 1877, on February 27 he appointed Babcock Inspector of Lighthouses of the Fifth District, a low-profile position that enabled Babcock to earn a living by making use of his engineering skills without drawing undue public attention to himself. Babcock continued to serve under Grant and his successors Rutherford B. Hayes, James A. Garfield, and Chester A. Arthur. On August 24, 1882, Arthur appointed Babcock Inspector of Lighthouses for the Sixth District, an appointment he carried out in addition to his Fifth District responsibilities.

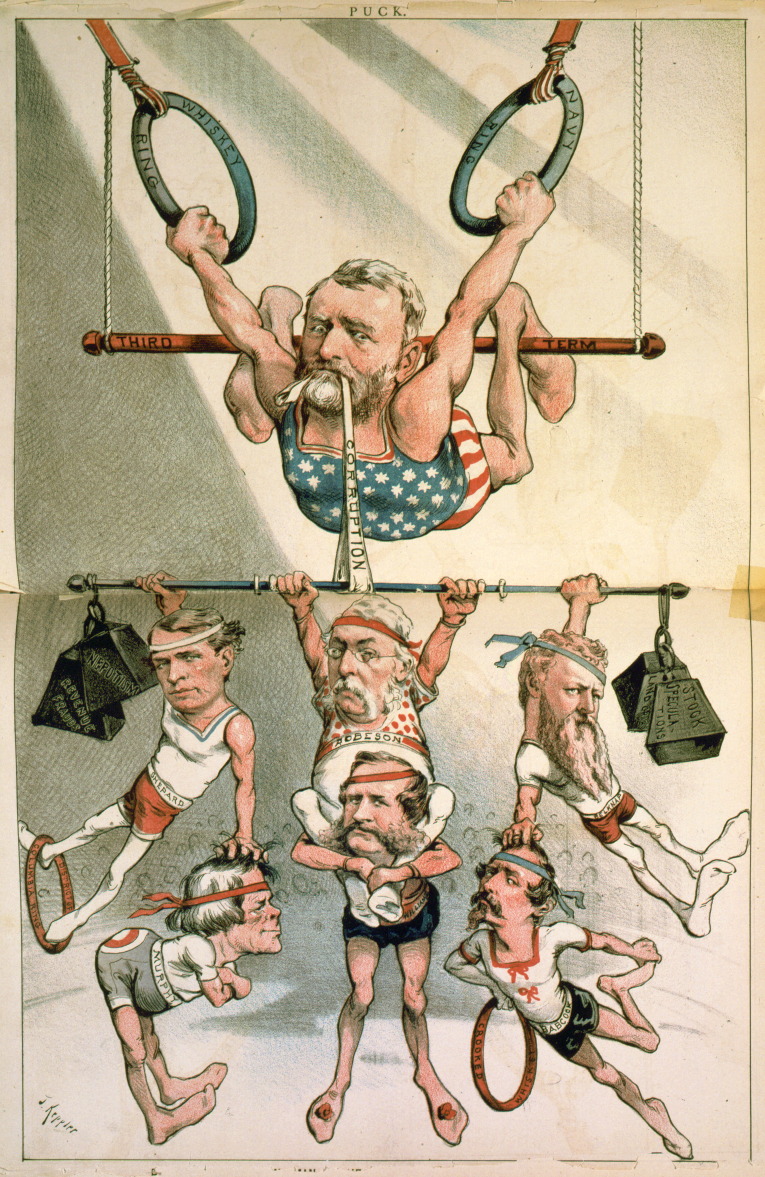
Puck, a Democratic magazine, in 1880 lampooned Babcock and Grant's alleged support of "rings" of corruption among his associates. "CROOKED WHISKEY"

=== Presidential election (1880) ===
In September 1879, Grant returned from his famous world tour. His popularity was as great as ever and Stalwart Republicans proposed to nominate him for a third term as president. Democrats sought to discredit his previous administration, including his cabinet and political appointees. Although Babock had been out of the political limelight for several years, his reputation was still marred because of his past involvement in corruption. On February 4, 1880, a color illustration by artist Joseph Keppler appeared in Puck magazine, in which Keppler ridiculed Grant and his associates, including Babcock, for having run a corrupt administration.

On May 14, 1880, Democratic Senator William W. Eaton of Connecticut read a memorial from Davis Hatch, who had been arrested in Santo Domingo in 1868 and was requesting reimbursement for the financial losses he said resulted from his imprisonment. According to Hatch, he was jailed on false charges and was going to be released, but Babcock, who was on the island in 1869 during negotiations for the proposed annexation treaty, interfered with Hatch's release and was complicit in Hatch being sentenced to a five-month prison term. Republican Senator Roscoe Conkling defended Babcock, saying that the Senate investigating committee's 1870 majority report fully exonerated him and that Eaton raised the issue only to try giving Democrats an advantage in an election year.

In June 1880, the Republicans held their national convention in Chicago. Grant was nominated by Conkling, his main Stalwart supporter. Republicans deadlocked between Grant and the other frontrunners, James G. Blaine and John Sherman. They eventually selected the dark horse candidate James A. Garfield as their candidate, effectively ending Grant's political career. Garfield went on to win the general election by defeating the Democratic nominee, Winfield Scott Hancock.

=== Mosquito Inlet lighthouse and drowning ===
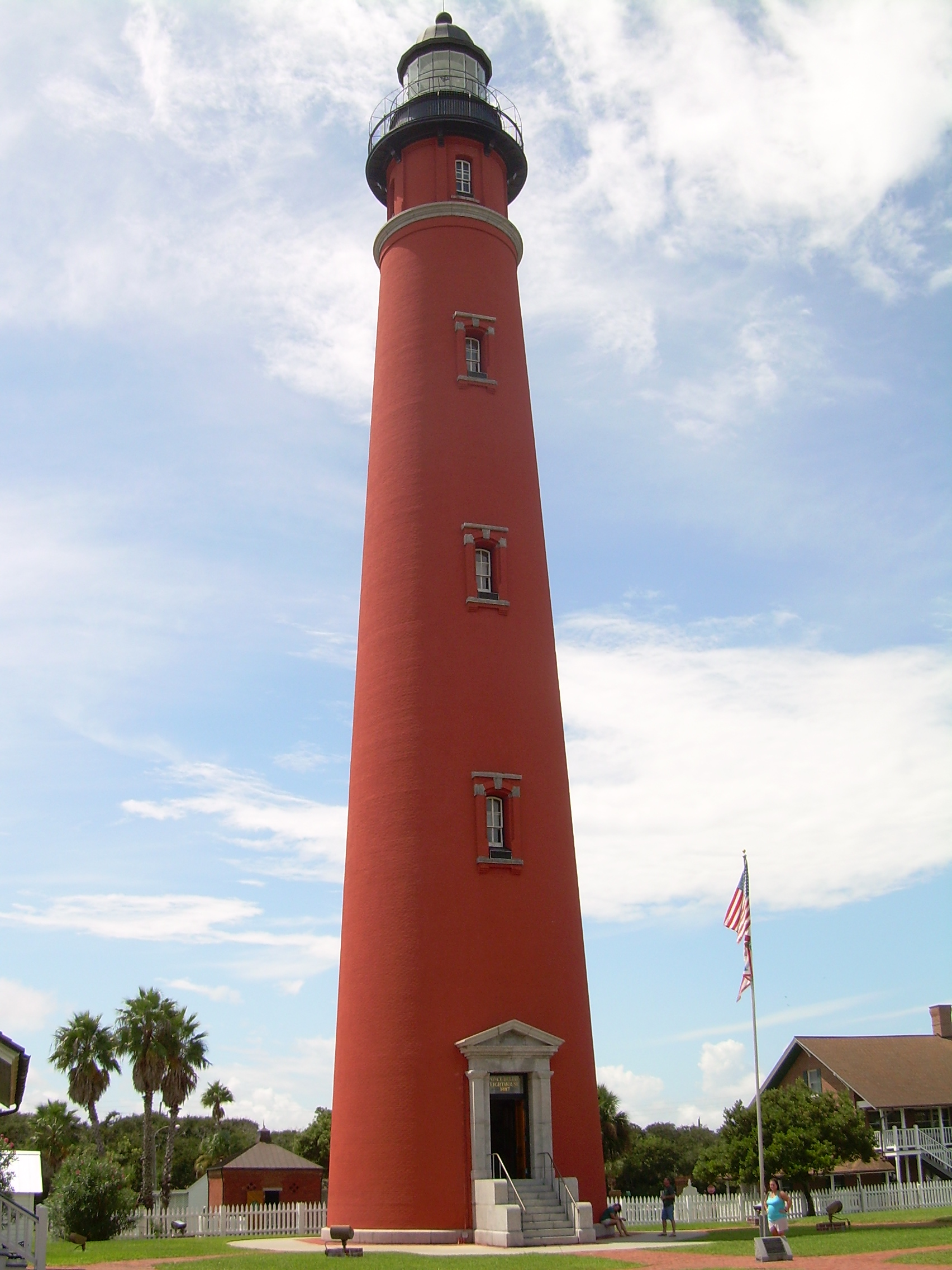
Mosquito Inlet Lighthouse

The Mosquito Inlet Lighthouse project started in 1883, and Babcock was the supervising engineer. On June 2, 1884, Babcock and his associates were aboard the government schooner Pharos to deliver construction supplies when they became anxious to return to land because a sudden storm created hazardous ocean conditions. The captain decided not to cross over the inlet bar during the storm because the construction supplies weighed down the ship, and he feared grounding it. As the storm worsened, Captain Newins of the nearby Bonito led seven men in a rowboat to Pharos in order to retrieve the passengers. In debating whether to wait out the storm on Pharos or try to make land, Babcock told his associates that since Newins and his crew had rowed safely to Pharos, they should be able to row to shore on tidal floods created by the storm.

After eating their lunch on Pharos, Babcock and his associates boarded a rowboat and started for shore. As they approached the inlet bar, swells capsized the boat several times, and it took on water. Babcock was thrown clear, but another person on the boat attached him to it by a lifeline. The boat and crew were battered by waves, oars, and other debris, and Babcock's lifeline was torn loose from the boat, which resulted in his drowning death. Upon reaching the shore, others who had been in the boat recovered Babcock's body and unsuccessfully tried to resuscitate him. Three others, including two of Babcock's associates, were also killed; the bodies of Babcock's associates, Levi P. Luckey and Benjamin F. Sutter, were recovered several days later, but the body of the fourth victim, a member of the boat's crew, was not found. The lighthouse construction project continued after Babcock's death, and was completed in 1887.

== Historical reputation ==
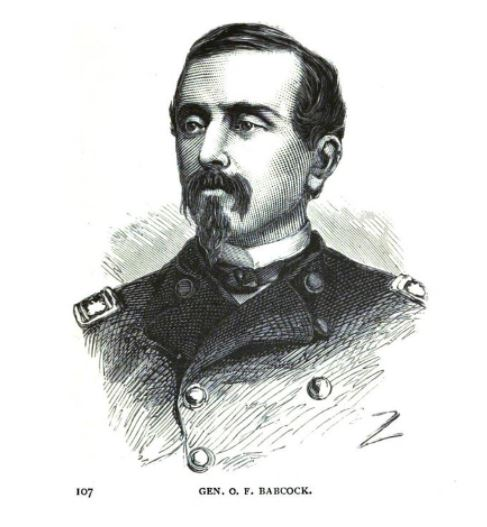
Gen. O.E. Babcock Illustrated Portrait 1880 Secrets of the Great Whiskey Ring

Scholars note Babcock's high class standing at West Point, engineering skills, and bravery during the American Civil War. Babcock also has been noted positively for his association with the antislavery views of the Radical Republicans. Historians also make positive mention of Babcock's post-White House career, noting that he served for eight years as a government lighthouse inspector and engineer, and did so capably and honestly.

Historians are critical of Babcock's political power as Grant's White House military aide, shielded by Grant, and not subject to resignation. Historians are also highly suspicious of Babcock's unauthorized Santo Domingo annexation pre-agreement. However, land acquisition by treaty was not uncommon, as the United States had acquired Alaska by treaty under the Johnson Administration, with Senator Charles Sumner's full support in the Senate. The opposition to Santo Domingo also had to do with the racism against the island's black population. The treaty of Alaska had been made with white Russians. Babcock did not have any aversion with Santo Domingo blacks being citizens of the United States. Babcock also envisioned Santo Domingo as a capital enterprise by American investment, due to the island's abundant natural resources.

Babcock's reputation, however, was marred also by his involvement in the Gold Ring, taking New York Customs House kickbacks, the Whiskey Ring, and the Safe Burglary Conspiracy. Most historians agree that Babcock betrayed Grant while President, and remain perplexed at Grant's loyalty to his wartime comrade, including Grant's unprecedented White House deposition on Babcock's behalf. In defending Babcock, Grant was not fully candid with the truth in his own testimony, probably to protect his family and his presidency from further scandal. With Babcock's reputation largely narrowed to observations about his corruption, loyalty to Grant, and wartime bravery, historians are generally not able to consider him in a wider context because he did not author an autobiography, nor has he been the subject of an extended biography. Historian William McFeely criticized Babcock for ignoring ethical values in the spirit of opportunism and personal gain.

On November 22, 2016, Mississippi State University Libraries announced the digitalization of Babcock's private diaries. Babcock's diaries are part of Mississippi State University Libraries' Ulysses S. Grant Digital Collection. Babcock's diaries began in 1863 during the height of the American Civil War, including his perspective on the siege of Vicksburg and his wartime experiences in Kentucky, Ohio, Tennessee, and Virginia. The diary collections also includes his famous post-war visit to Santo Domingo in 1869 serving as President Grant's special agent and personal secretary. The collection includes Babcock's supplementary materials of speeches, correspondence, and newspaper clippings. The Mississippi State University Libraries said that Babcock's brokerage of the annexation of Santo Domingo, "began what became a string of controversies and scandals surrounding Babcock and his position as aide to the President." The scandals culminated in Babcock's involvement in the Whiskey Ring, indictment for tax fraud in 1875, and corruption trial in St. Louis in 1876. Throughout these scandals President Grant gave Babcock his confidence.

According to presidential historian Charles W. Calhoun, Babcock emerged as Grant's "political majordomo, if not his jackal." Babcock's rumored control, although an exaggeration, over Grant's Navy and Army secretaries, "reflected the impression of Babcock's arrogance and pervasive power." Babcock was viewed as Grant's "Svengali [fictional character (1894)] leading the president unto unrighteous paths." Many viewed Babcock was dishonest with "dubious notions of conflict of interest." Grant's Secretary of State Hamilton Fish said Babcock "has brains & very many excellent & gentlemanly qualities but is spoiled by his position & a want of delicacy & consideration for the official responsibilities & proper authority (official) of civilians."

Babcock was not the only Union military officer to fall from grace while America was burgeoning into an industrial giant during the Grant presidential era. Fellow Union officer and Grant's Secretary of War William W. Belknap scandalously resigned office over accepting extortion money from a Fort Sill sutlership. Belknap was impeached by the House but acquitted in a sensational Senate trial during the summer of 1876.

Historian McFeely says that Babcock turned down a lucrative job with the Pacific Railroad in 1866, and he was well qualified. McFeely said that Babcock "had another flourishing enterprise at which to succeed —— General Grant's career. He saw his place in it as secure." McFeely described Babcock as an "odd, restless, ambitious man", who was "curiously affectionate". Babcock often wrote to his wife, romantically, and he and his wife lived a simple lifestyle. He was also considered a man of freedom with a lavish lifestyle.

== See also ==
- List of American Civil War brevet generals (Union)
- Bibliography of the American Civil War
- Bibliography of Ulysses S. Grant

== Sources ==
Books

- Annual Report of the Light-House Board of the United States to the Secretary of Treasury for the Fiscal Year Ended June 30, 1898. Washington D.C.: Government Printing Office. 1898.
- Babcock, Orville E. (October 5, 1866). Military Posts (Report). Washington D.C.
- Babcock, Stephen (1903). Isaiah Babcock, Sr. and his descendants. New York: Eaton & Mains.
- Brands, H. W. (2012). The Man Who Saved the Union: Ulysses S. Grant in War and Peace. New York: Doubleday. ISBN 978-0-385-53241-9.
- Calhoun, Charles W. (2017). The Presidency of Ulysses S. Grant. Lawrence, KS: University Press of Kansas. ISBN 9780700624843.
- Chernow, Ron (2017). Grant. New York: Penguin Press. ISBN 978-1-5942-0487-6.
- Coffey, Walter (2014). The Reconstruction Years. Bloomington, IN: AuthorHouse LLC. ISBN 9781491851920.
- Eicher, David J. (2001). The Longest Night: A Military History of the Civil War. New York: Simon & Schuster. p. 615. ISBN 978-0-7432-1846-7.
- Eicher, John H.; Eicher, David J. (2001). Civil War High Commands. Stanford, CA: Stanford University Press. ISBN 978-0-8047-3641-1.
- Garmon, Bonnie; Garmon, Jim (2009). Indian River Country 1880-1889. Vol. 1.
- Johnson, Rossiter, ed. (1906). "Babcock, Orville E.". The Biographical Dictionary of America. Vol. 1. Boston: American Biographical Society. p. 172.
- Jones, Evan C.; Sword, Wiley (2014). Gateway to the Confederacy: New Perspectives on the Chickamauga and Chattanooga Campaigns, 1862–1863. Chapel Hill, NC: University of North Carolina Press. p. 116. ISBN 978-0-8071-5512-7.
- Jordan, David M. (1995). Winfield Scott Hancock: A Soldier's Life. Bloomington, IN: Indiana University Press. ISBN 978-0-2532-1058-6.
- Kahan, Paul (2018). The Presidency of Ulysses S. Grant Preserving the Civil War's Legacy. Yardley, PA: Westholme Publishing, LLC. ISBN 978-1-59416-273-2.
- Kirshner, Ralph (1999). The Class of 1861: Custer, Ames, and Their Classmates After West Point. Carbondale: Southern Illinois University Press. ISBN 0-8093-2066-5.
- Lingley, Charles Ramsdell (1928). Allen Johnson (ed.). Dictionary of American Biography Babcock, Orville E. Vol. 1. New York: Charles Scribner's Sons. p. 460.
- McCarthy, Michael J. (2016). Confederate Waterloo: The Battle of Five Forks, April 1, 1865, and the Controversy that Brought Down a General. El Dorado Hills, CA: Savas Beatie. ISBN 978-1-6112-1310-2.
- McDonald, John (1880). Secrets of the Great Whiskey Ring. St. Louis, Mo., W. S. Bryan.
- McFeely, William S. (1981). Grant: A Biography. Norton. ISBN 0-393-01372-3.
- McFeely, William S. (1974). Woodward, C. Vann (ed.). Responses of the Presidents to Charges of Misconduct. New York: Delacorte Press. pp. 133–162. ISBN 0-440-05923-2.
- Pletcher, David M. (1998). The Diplomacy of Trade and Investment: American Economic Expansion in the Hemisphere, 1865–1900. Columbia: University of Missouri Press. ISBN 0-8262-1127-5.
- Knott, J. Proctor (1876). Testimony Before the U.S. House of Representatives Select Committee Considering the Whiskey Frauds. Washington, DC: US Government Printing Office.
- Porter, Horace (2000). Campaigning With Grant. Lincoln, NE: University of Nebraska Press. p. viii. ISBN 978-0-8032-8763-1 – via Google Books.
- Simon, John Y. (2002). "Ulysses S. Grant". In Graff, Henry (ed.). The Presidents: A Reference History (7th ed.). Macmillan Library Reference USA. pp. 245–260. ISBN 0-684-80551-0.
- Smith, Jean Edward (2001). Grant. New York: Simon & Schuster. ISBN 0-684-84927-5.
- White, Ronald C. (2016). American Ulysses: A Life of Ulysses S. Grant. Random House Publishing Group. ISBN 978-1-5883-6992-5.

Primary

- "Orville Babcock Diaries". Mississippi State University Libraries. November 22, 2016. Archived from the original on February 22, 2017.

Internet articles

- "MSU Libraries digitize Civil War diaries and letters". Mississippi State University. November 22, 2016.
- O'neil, Tim (February 25, 2017). "Feb. 25, 1876 • 'Whiskey ring' corruption trial in St. Louis was a national sensation". St. Louis Post-Dispatch. Archived from the original on 2018-07-12.
- Martinez, Mike (March 15, 2021). "Scoundrels Political Scandals in American History-Scandals of the 1870s".

New York Times

- "Gen. Babcock Drowned". New York Times. June 4, 1884.
- "A Cheap Democratic Trick" (PDF). New York Times. May 15, 1880.
