= Porten =

Porten is a surname. Notable people with the surname include:

- Franz Porten (1859–1932), German actor and film director
- Harri Porten (born 1972), German software engineer
- Henny Porten (1890–1960), German actress and film producer
- Rosa Porten (1884–1972), German screenwriter, actress, and director

== See also ==
- Morten
- Porter (name)
