= Whiskey Ring =

American political scandal

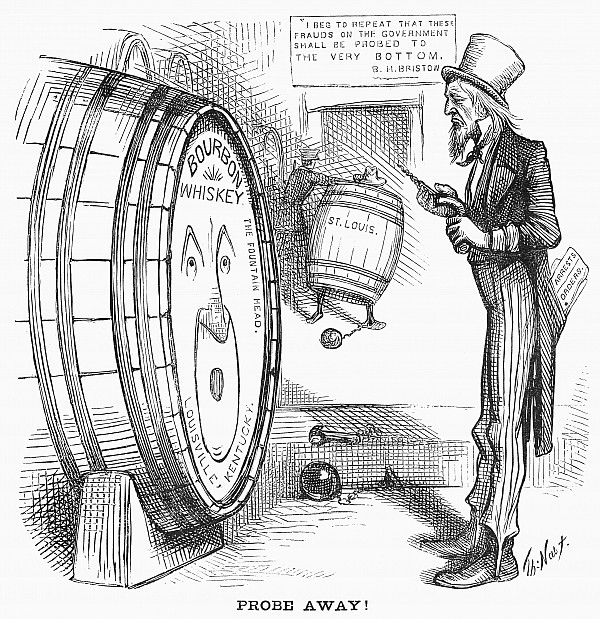
Political cartoon by Thomas Nast, March 1876

The Whiskey Ring took place from 1871 to 1876 during the Gilded Age, centering in St. Louis during the presidency of Ulysses S. Grant. This ring, a significant act of corruption during this time period, was an American scandal, broken in May 1875, involving the diversion of tax revenues in a conspiracy among government agents, politicians, whiskey distillers, and distributors. Whiskey distillers bribed officials from the U.S. Department of the Treasury to increase profits and evade taxes. Grant's Justice Department prosecuted members of Grant's own Republican Party who were part of the Ring. The kingpin of the Whiskey Ring was the notorious General John McDonald, whom Grant had appointed Revenue Collector of Missouri District in 1869. Under the leadership of Grant's Secretary of Treasury, Benjamin Bristow, a reformer, the Ring was uncovered and broken up.

Prosecutions of members of the Ring started in 1875 and ended in 1876. McDonald was indicted, put on trial, found guilty, fined $5,000, and sentenced to federal prison for 18 months. Grant's private Secretary Orville Babcock was indicted, put on trial in St. Louis, but acquitted in February 1876. Grant pardoned McDonald from prison on March 3, 1877, the last full day Grant was in office. In 1880, an angered McDonald authored a salacious book The Secrets of the Great Whiskey Ring, in an effort to keep Grant from getting a third term nomination. McDonald also believed Babcock was guilty and had deserved to go to prison with him. How much Grant knew about the Whiskey Ring is a matter of speculation by historians. Three million dollars of stolen tax revenue was recovered by Bristow, with 110 convictions.

== History and formation ==
During the Lincoln Administration, Mid-West whiskey distillers created a slush fund by bribing treasury agents and evading taxes on whiskey they produced and sold. The Whiskey Ring was formed by Republican operatives in 1871 on the pretext to raise money for Republican campaigns. However, Republican campaign contributions were minimal compared to how much was pocketed by the ring itself. Distilleries and leaders of the ring received between $45,000 and $60,000 each. By the mid-1870s, during the Ulysses S. Grant administration, the illegal cartel had organized into an efficient machine of whiskey distillers who kept Treasury agents in line by aggressive tactics. By 1873, the ring had become a purely criminal crime syndicate. The whiskey syndicate involved distillers, government officials, rectifiers, gaugers, storekeepers, and internal revenue agents. Due to the increase of liquor taxes after the Civil War, whiskey was supposed to be taxed at 70 cents per gallon. However, distillers would instead pay the officials 35 cents per gallon, and the illicit whiskey was stamped as having the tax paid. Before they were caught, a group of politicians was able to siphon off millions of dollars in federal taxes. In St. Louis, the ring was led by Missouri Revenue Collector John McDonald, appointed by President Ulysses S. Grant, in 1869. McDonald coordinated with Grant's private secretary, Orville Babcock, in Washington D.C. to keep the ring hidden and prevent it being exposed.

=== Investigations ===
On June 4, 1874, Benjamin Bristow was appointed to Secretary of Treasury by Ulysses S. Grant. Bristow, an ambitious Kentuckian, was zealous for reform and wanted to make a name for himself. Grant's appointment of Bristow was popular among reformers. In December 1874, Bristow wanted to send a team of investigators to St. Louis to look into the Whiskey Ring. This attempt was thwarted by Orville Babcock, Grant's private secretary, who persuaded Commissioner of Internal Revenue J.W. Douglass to revoke the order. Bristow and Bluford Wilson, Solicitor of the Treasury, were undeterred and sought an independent way to investigate the ring. An effort to break up Treasury Supervisors and move them to different cities proved unpractical and unsuccessful. George Fishback, the proprietor of the St. Louis Democrat, gave Bristow and Wilson an informant to investigate the Ring and uncover illegal activity. Wilson added other agents. The secret investigators reported to Bristow evidence of a massive ring of conspirators between revenue agents and distillers. Whiskey was labeled as vinegar, or falsely recorded at a lower proof, while revenue stamps were used over and over again. The cheating cost the Treasury millions of dollars.

In mid-April 1875, Bristow gave Grant evidence of the ring. Grant left Washington to attend Centennial commemorations of the Battles of Lexington and Concord. Hearing rumors of impending raids by Bristow, Supervisor of Internal Revenue John McDonald, of Saint Louis, went to Washington D.C. With the evidence presented against him, McDonald broke down and confessed to Bristow. McDonald resigned on April 23 and returned to St. Louis. When Grant returned Bristow informed him of the full operations of the ring. Bristow urged Grant to fire Commissioner of Internal Revenue J.W. Douglas for criminal negligence. Grant complied and replaced Douglas with Daniel Pratt of Indiana.

== Prosecutions (1875-1876) ==
On Monday, May 10, 1875, Bristow conducted a series of raids across the nation that broke up the Whiskey Ring. The trials began at Jefferson City, Missouri in October 1875. Ultimately, of 238 people who were indicted, 110 convictions were made and more than $3 million in taxes were recovered. President Ulysses S. Grant appointed General John Brooks Henderson (a former U.S. Senator from Missouri) to serve as special prosecutor in charge of the indictments and trials, but Grant eventually fired Gen. Henderson for challenging Grant's interference in the prosecutions. There was also some animosity between Grant and Henderson, because Senator Henderson, in 1868, voted to acquit President Andrew Johnson, saving Johnson from impeachment by one vote. Grant replaced Henderson with an attorney James Broadhead. The ringleader John McDonald, was indicted, tried by Henderson and United States Attorney of the Eastern District of Missouri, David P. Dyer. McDonald was convicted, fined $5,000, and sentenced to prison for 18 months. Revenue agent John A. Joyce, was indicted, tried, convicted, and sent to the penitentiary.

=== Orville Babcock's indictment ===
In July 1875, Bristow and Attorney General Edwards Pierrepont, working as Grant's anti-corruption team, met Grant, who was vacationing at Long Branch, and gave him evidence that Babcock was a member of the ring. Grant told Pierrepont "Let no guilty man escape..." and said if Babcock was guilty then it was the "greatest piece of traitorism to me that a man could possibly practice." In October, Babcock was summoned in front of Grant, Bristow, and Pierrepont at the White House to explain two ambiguous telegrams handwritten by Babcock and signed "Sylph", an apparent code name for Babcock. The first message said, "I have succeeded. They will not go. I will write you." (December 10, 1874) and the second one said, "We have official information that the enemy weakens. Push things." (February 3, 1875) Bristow had shown these messages to Grant at a cabinet meeting the same day. Babcock said something to Grant, unintelligible to Bristow and Pierrepont, and Grant appeared satisfied by Babcock's interpretation of the telegrams.

Pierrepont and Bristow, believing the matter to be crucial, insisted Babcock send a message to his telegraphic correspondent demanding that this individual come to Washington to give his version of the messages. After Babcock seemed to be taking too long, Pierrepont went to check on him and found Babcock writing a warning to revenue agent John A. Joyce, his St. Louis confederate, to be on his guard. Infuriated, Pierrepont grabbed Babcock's pen and dashed through his message yelling "You don't want to send your argument; send the fact, and go there and make your explanation. I do not understand it." Grant, on the other hand, was divided between the loyalty he had for Babcock, and his desire for Bristow and Pierrepont, trustworthy members of his cabinet, to prosecute the Whiskey Ring. Since Babcock had no acceptable explanation for his messages, he was indicted for conspiracy to defraud the Treasury of the United States on November 4, 1875.

=== Orville Babcock's trial ===
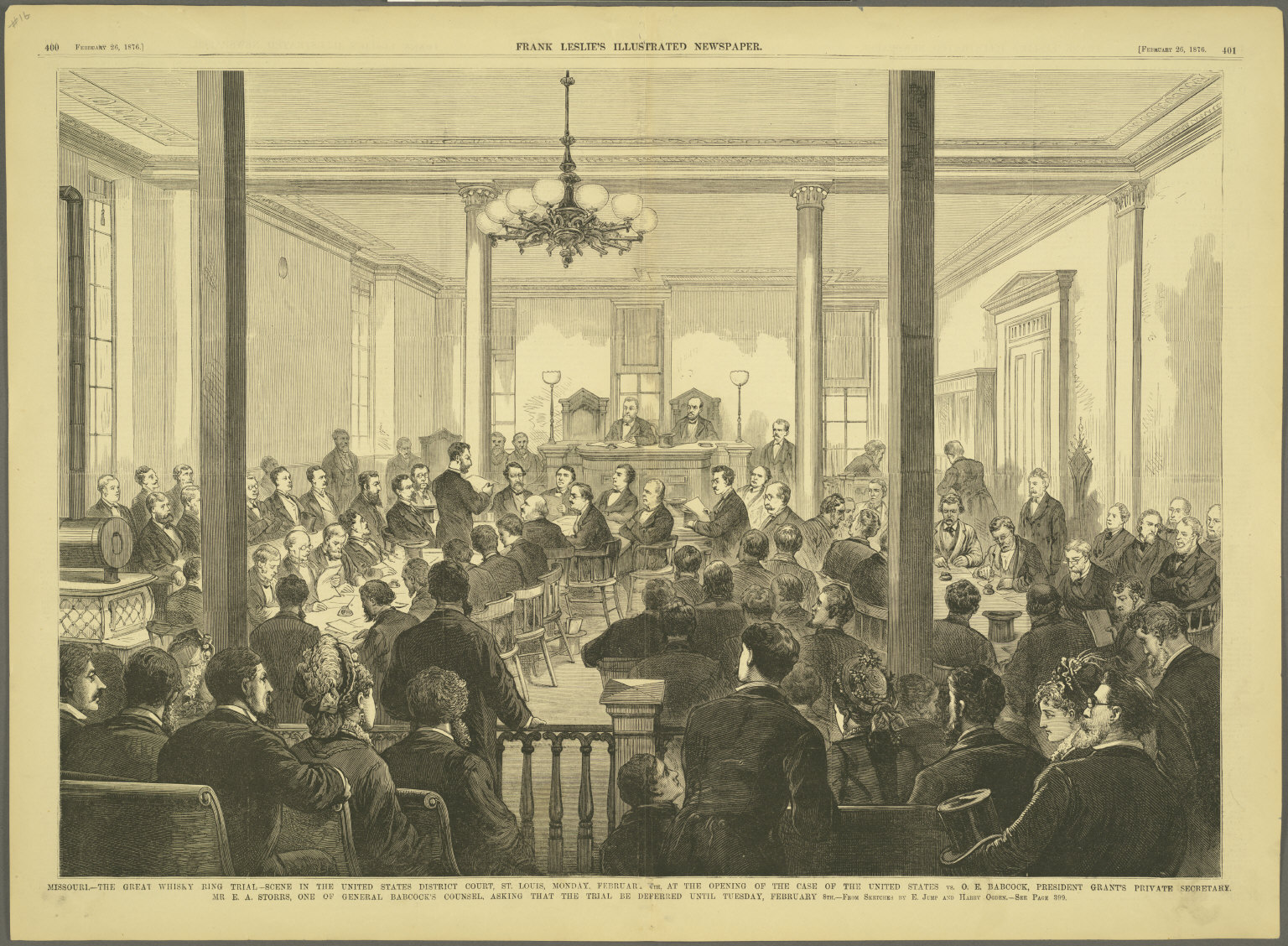
Orville Babcock's 1876 trial

On February 8, 1876, Babcock went on trial, an event that lasted eighteen days. Babcock's defense team was noted for its prowess and included Grant's former Attorney General George Williams, a top criminal defense advocate and lawyer, Emory A. Storrs, and a former appeals judge (New York), John K. Porter. It took place at the U.S. Post Office and Customs House located at 218 North Third Street, and the status of the defendant made the trial a popular and well-attended spectacle. Demand to attend the proceedings was so great that only persons with signed passes and Whiskey Ring defendants were allowed in. Babcock arrived in civilian clothes, including sky-blue pants, a silk hat, and a light jacket. When court was not in session, Babcock stayed at the newly rebuilt Lindell Hotel on Sixth Street and Washington Avenue.

Grant's White House deposition took place on February 12; it was notarized by Chief Justice Morrison Waite and witnessed by both Bristow and Pierrepont. In his statement, Grant fully supported the Whiskey Ring prosecutions, but willfully refused to testify against Babcock, despite having been informed by Bristow of Babcock's duplicity. Instead, Grant praised Babcock, saying he had "great confidence" in Babcock's integrity, and that his confidence in Babcock was "unshaken".

On February 17, Babcock's defense counsel read President Grant's deposition to the jury, which severely weakened any chance of Babcock being convicted. The same day, General William T. Sherman testified that Babcock's "character has been very good." Grant's deposition, Sherman's in-person testimony, and the evidence presented by Babcock's shrewd defense counsel led to his acquittal on February 25. A rumor spread that Pierrepont had leaked information to Babcock that aided in his acquittal, but Pierrepont denied this and suggested that Babcock himself had started the rumor. A few months later Grant's appointed anti-corruption team broke up. Pierrepont resigned from office on May 21, 1876, and was appointed by Grant United States Minister to the United Kingdom on July 11, 1876. Enmity between Grant and Bristow forced Bristow out of the cabinet, and he resigned on June 20, 1876.

== Effect on Republican Party ==
The Whiskey Ring was seen by many as a sign of corruption under the Republican governments that took power across the nation following the American Civil War. However, Grant's appointment, Bristow, was a hero among reformers. Babcock, the private secretary to the President, was indicted as a member of the ring. He was acquitted through the personal intervention and testimony of President Grant. Newspapers at the time were known to slant toward a Republican agenda, making light of the trial. This led many people to think the Whiskey Ring was a ploy for the Republican party to increase their funds. For this reason, President Grant, although not directly involved in the ring, came to be seen as emblematic of Republican corruption, and later scandals involving his Secretary of War William W. Belknap only confirmed that perception. The Whiskey Ring, along with other alleged abuses of power by the Republican party, contributed to a national weariness of Reconstruction, which ended Grant's presidency with the Compromise of 1877.

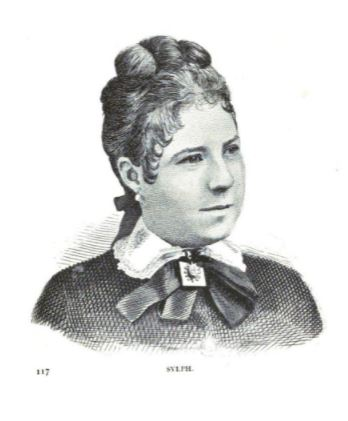
Louise Hawkins, also known as "Sylph"; the St. Louis woman who captured the attention of Babcock

== "Sylph" ==
According to John McDonald, the kingpin of the Whiskey Ring, there was much public interest and speculation of the "Sylph" letter signature. McDonald said that when Babcock had attended the annual St. Louis Fair, with Col. John A. Joyce, while they were walking on 5th Street, he saw a very attractive woman, who would be nicknamed the "Sylph" for her beauty. Although Babcock was a married man, he inquired who the lady was. Babcock reportedly said to Joyce, "She is the most beautiful and bewitching woman I ever saw; for heaven's sake; let us turn the corner and meet her again so that you can give me an introduction". Later, meeting at Freund's restaurant, Babcock was introduced to Louise Hawkins, the "Sylph". Babcock would later use "Sylph", as a code signature for Babcock, in letter correspondence to Joyce.

== Sources ==
- Brands, H. W. (28 May 2013). The Man Who Saved the Union: Ulysses S. Grant in War and Peace (First ed.). New York: Doubleday. ISBN 978-0-385-53241-9. LCCN 2011043795. OCLC 758099274. OL 25079083M – via Internet Archive.
- Calhoun, Charles W. (28 August 2017). The Presidency of Ulysses S. Grant. American Presidency Series. Lawrence, Kansas: University Press of Kansas. ISBN 978-0-7006-2484-3. LCCN 2017026679. OCLC 986027705. OL 26939040M. scholarly review and response by Calhoun at doi:10.14296/RiH/2014/2270
- Chernow, Ron (2017). Grant. New York: Penguin Press. ISBN 978-1-59420-487-6 – via Google Books.
- Kahan, Paul (2018). The Presidency of Ulysses S. Grant: Preserving the Civil War's Legacy. Yardley, Pennsylvania: Westholme Publishing, LLC. ISBN 978-1-59416-273-2 – via Google Books.
- McDonald, John (1880). Secrets of the Great Whiskey Ring and Eighteen Months In The Penitentiary. St. Louis, Missouri: W. S. Bryan – via Internet Archive.
- McFeely, William S. (1974). Woodward C. Vann (ed.). Responses of the Presidents to Charges of Misconduct. New York: Delacorte Press. pp. 133–62. ISBN 978-0-440-05923-3 – via Internet Archive.
- Rives, Timothy (Fall 2000). "Grant, Babcock, and the Whiskey Ring". Prologue. Vol. 32, no. 3. National Archives and Records Administration. ISSN 0033-1031. OCLC 321015582.
- Smith, Jean Edward (2001). Grant. New York: Simon & Schuster. ISBN 978-0-684-84927-0 – via Internet Archive.
- White, Ronald C. (2016). American Ulysses: A Life of Ulysses S. Grant. Random House Publishing Group. ISBN 978-1-58836-992-5 – via Google Books.
