= Judge Porter =

Judge Porter may refer to:

- Alexander Porter (1785–1844), American politician, planter, Louisiana Supreme Court judge
- Augustus S. Porter (1769–1849), first judge in Niagara County, New York
- David J. Porter (judge) (born 1966), judge of the United States Court of Appeals for the Third Circuit
- David Stewart Porter (1909–1989), judge of the United States District Court for the Southern District of Ohio
- Donald J. Porter (1921–2003), judge of the United States District Court for the District of South Dakota
- Robert William Porter (1926–1991), judge of the United States District Court for the Northern District of Texas

== See also ==
- Justice Porter (disambiguation)
