= Justice Porter =

Justice Porter may refer to:

- Alexander Porter (1785–1844), associate justice of the Louisiana Supreme Court
- Donald J. Porter (1921–2003), associate justice of the South Dakota Supreme Court
- James W. Porter (judge) (1887–1959), associate justice of the Idaho Supreme Court
- John K. Porter (1819–1892), judge of the New York Court of Appeals
- Newton Hazelton Porter (1877–1945), associate justice of the New Jersey Supreme Court
- Samuel Porter, Baron Porter (1877–1956), Justice of the High Court of England and Lord of Appeal in Ordinary
- Thomas Porter (Vermont politician) (1734–1833), associate justice of the Vermont Supreme Court
- Silas Wright Porter (1857–1937), associate justice of the Kansas Supreme Court

== See also ==
- Judge Porter (disambiguation)
