= John McDonald (Union army general) =

American Union Army general (1832–1912)

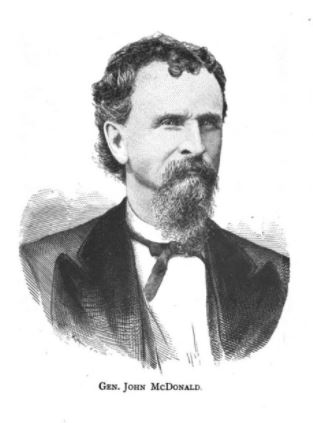
General John McDonald 1832–1912

John McDonald was born in Rochester, New York, on February 22, 1832. At the age of nine, he was orphaned. To support himself, McDonald worked a series of odd jobs on canals, lakes, and rivers. He arrived in St. Louis, Missouri, at the age of 15. McDonald worked his way up in responsible river trade jobs. By the 1850s, he was a passenger agent for a St. Louis steam company. Eventually, he started his own business, running a freight steamer that carried passengers on the Missouri River. At the outbreak of the American Civil War, McDonald was a strong Union man. Appointed a Major rank, McDonald raised and outfitted the Eighth Regiment that served in battles at Fort Henry, Fort Donelson, and Shiloh. President Abraham Lincoln appointed him a brigadier general. McDonald kept the title of "General" for the rest of his life.

After the Appomattox campaign, McDonald married Addie Hayes of Memphis, Tennessee. In October 1869, President Ulysses S. Grant appointed McDonald Internal Revenue Collector of the Missouri District headquartered in St. Louis. McDonald organized an illegal racketeering operation known as the Whiskey Ring, profiteering by depleting the Treasury of tax revenue. In 1875, McDonald was indicted and prosecuted in November 1875. Found guilty, McDonald was fined $5,000 and sentenced to serve 18 months in federal prison. McDonald's Washington associate and President Grant's private secretary, Orville E. Babcock, was also indicted and prosecuted for involvement in the Whiskey Ring, but Babcock was found not guilty. McDonald believed Babcock was guilty and should join him in prison. McDonald received a presidential pardon on January 26, 1877, from President Grant. In 1880, his book Secrets of the Great Whiskey Ring and Eighteen Months in the Penitentiary was published. McDonald died in Chicago in 1912.
