= General Porter =

General Porter may refer to:

- Andrew Porter (Civil War general) (1820–1872), Union Army brigadier general
- David Dixon Porter (Medal of Honor) (1877–1944), U.S. Marine Corps major general
- Fitz John Porter (1822–1901), Union Army major general
- Horace Porter (1837–1921), Union Army brevet brigadier general
- Moses Porter (1756–1822), U.S. Army brigadier general
- Peter Buell Porter (1773–1844), U.S. Army brigadier general
- Ray E. Porter (1891–1963), U.S. Army major general
- Robert Porter (British Army officer) (1858–1928), British Army major general
- Robert W. Porter Jr. (1908–2000), U.S. Army four-star general
- Selwyn Porter (1905–1963), Australian Army major general
- Whitworth Porter (1827–1892), British Army major general

== See also ==
- Attorney General Porter (disambiguation)
