= John A. Joyce =

American military officer, poet and writer (1842–1915)

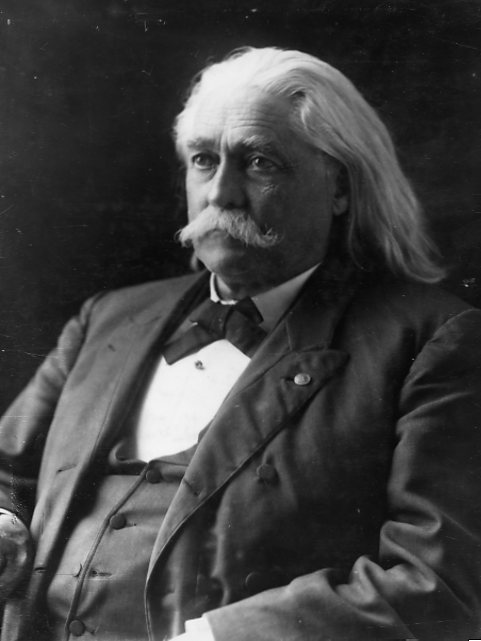
- Portrait of Joyce
- Born: John Alexander Joyce; July 4, 1842; Sruhagh, Ireland
- Died: January 18, 1915 (aged 72); Washington, D.C., U.S.
- Burial place: Oak Hill Cemetery; Washington, D.C., U.S.
- Alma mater: Highland Literary Institute
- Spouse: Katie M. (died 1902)
- Children: 3
- Military career
- Allegiance: United States
- Branch: United States Army (Union Army)
- Service years: 1861–1864
- Rank: First Lieutenant
- Unit: 24th Kentucky Infantry Regiment
- Conflicts: American Civil War; Battle of Shiloh; Battle of Perryville; Siege of Knoxville; Battle of Resaca; Battle of Kennesaw Mountain (WIA)
- Other work: Poet; writer

Signature
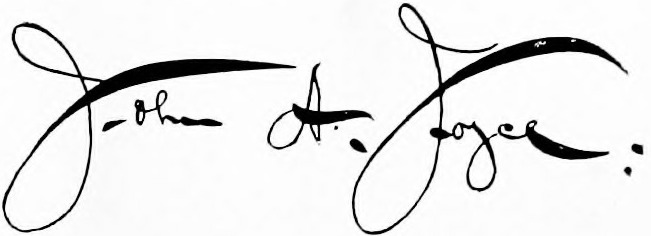

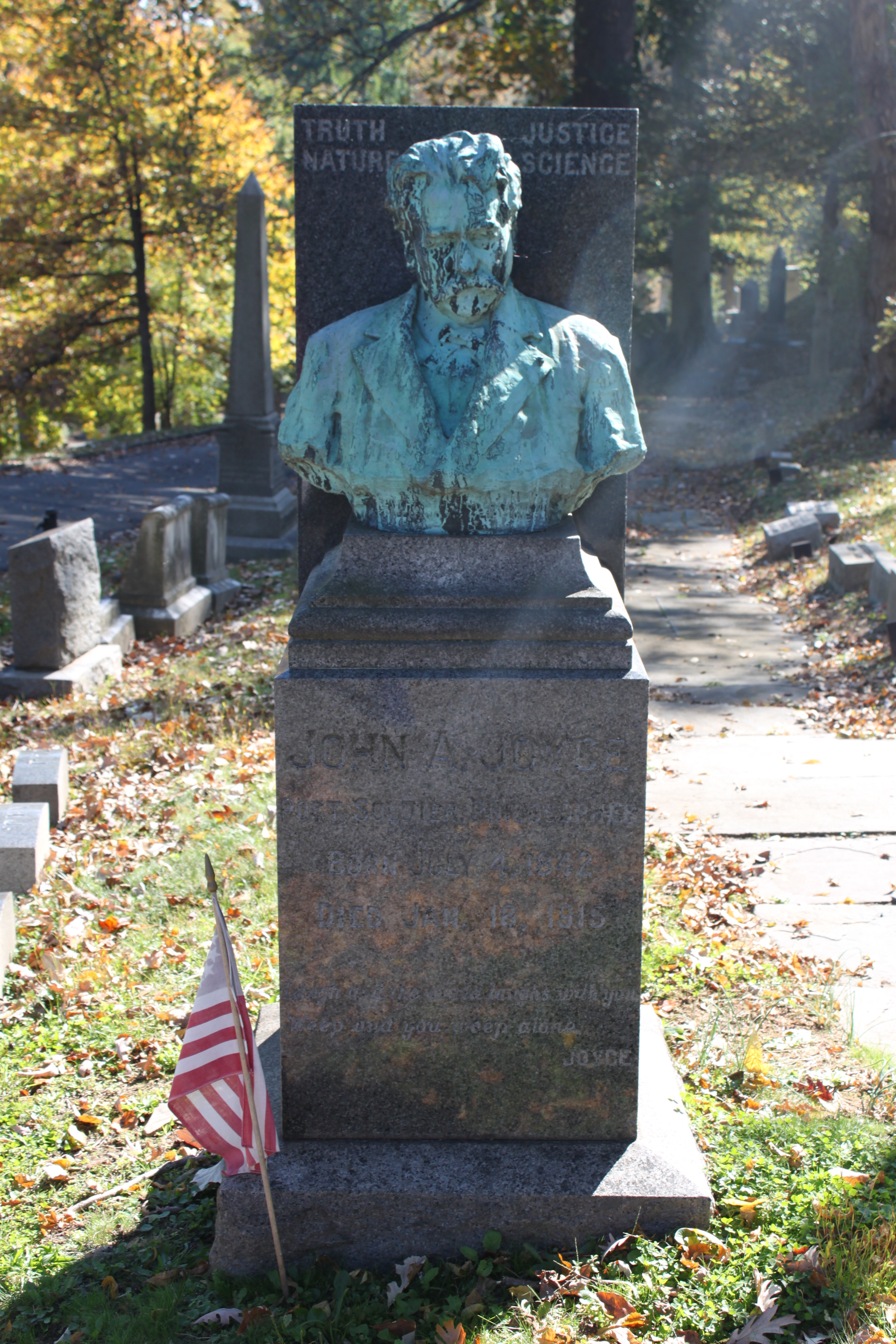
Memorial of Joyce at Oak Hill Cemetery

John Alexander Joyce (July 4, 1842 – January 18, 1915) was an Irish–American poet and writer. He served as a first lieutenant and regimental adjutant in the Union Army. He was indicted for his role as Internal Revenue Service agent in the Whiskey Ring.

== Early life ==
John Alexander Joyce was born on July 4, 1842, in Sruhagh, Ireland, to Michael and Catherine Joyce. He moved to Kentucky at an early age and grew up there. He graduated from Highland Literary Institute in Mount Sterling, Kentucky, in 1859. He then studied law. After the war, he read law in the office of Senator William B. Allison in Dubuque, Iowa. He graduated from Senator Allison's office on November 8, 1864.

== Career ==
As of April 1861, Joyce worked as a clerk of the circuit court in Bath County, Kentucky. On September 29, 1861, Joyce enlisted as a private in the Union Army's Company I, 24th Kentucky Infantry Regiment at Olympian Springs, a hotel and resort near Owingsville, Kentucky. On December 1, 1861, Joyce was promoted to orderly sergeant of Company I. Joyce was promoted to second lieutenant on March 22, 1862, and promoted to first lieutenant for gallantry at the Battle of Shiloh on May 30, 1862. Joyce was present at the Battle of Perryville on October 8, 1862, and was assigned as regimental adjutant on September 1, 1862. On November 25, 1863, Joyce was at the Siege of Knoxville. He was recommended for promotion by General Mahlon Dickerson Manson for his actions in the Battle of Resaca. On June 27, 1864, Joyce was shot in the thigh at the Battle of Kennesaw Mountain. He received an operation at College Hospital in Nashville, Tennessee, in July 1864 and was sent to a hospital in Louisville, Kentucky. In fall of 1864, Joyce applied to be a colonel. On November 4, 1864, the War Department removed Joyce from service due to his injury. Joyce was often referred to as "Colonel Joyce" but did not receive the rank.

On November 1, 1866, Joyce moved to Washington, D.C. He was offered a commission in the Regular Army, but declined. Joyce joined the Internal Revenue Service and was stationed in St. Louis, Missouri. In October 1875, Joyce was imprisoned at a penitentiary in Jefferson City, Missouri, for his part in the Whiskey Ring. He was pardoned by President Rutherford B. Hayes in December 1877. He later returned to Washington, D.C. Around 1910, Joyce became a clerk for the U.S. Department of the Treasury. He worked with the Treasury until his death.

Joyce wrote biographies and poetry. He claimed to have written Ella Wheeler Wilcox's 1883 poem that begins memorably, "Laugh, and the world laughs with you. Weep, and you weep alone." He also published the following books:

- "Checkered Life" (1883)
- "Jewels of Memory" (1896)
- "Peculiar Poems" (1900)
- "Zig Zag"
- "Complete Poems"
- "Brickbats and Bouquets"
- "Oliver Goldsmith"
- "Edgar Allan Poe"
- "Beautiful Washington" (1903)
- "Personal Recollections of Shakespeare"
- "Truth"
- "Robert Burns"

== Personal life ==
Joyce married Katie M., a clerk at the Treasury Department. She died in 1902. Joyce had three daughters, Katie Darling (died 1886), Florence and Libby. Joyce was a Freemason – a member of Columbia Lodge No. 3 in Washington, D.C. He was often referred to as the "poet of Washington".

Later in life, Joyce was friends with Champ Clark who grew up near his boyhood home in Kentucky.

Joyce lived at 3238 R St. NW in Washington, D.C. Joyce died at Providence Hospital in Washington, D.C., on January 18, 1915. He erected a monument of himself at Oak Hill Cemetery in Washington, D.C. He is buried there.
