= Attorney General Porter =

Attorney General Porter may refer to:

- Sir Andrew Porter, 1st Baronet (1837–1919), Attorney-General for Ireland
- Christian Porter (born 1970), Attorney-General of Australia
- Dana Porter (1901–1967), Attorney General of Ontario
- William Porter (Attorney General) (1805–1880), Attorney-General of the Cape Colony

== See also ==
- General Porter (disambiguation)
