= Senator Porter =

Senator Porter may refer to:

== Members of the United States Senate ==
- Alexander Porter (1785–1844), U.S. Senator from Louisiana from 1833 to 1837
- Augustus Seymour Porter (1798–1872), U.S. Senator from Michigan from 1840 to 1845

== United States state senate members ==
- Claude R. Porter (1872–1946), Iowa State Senate
- David R. Porter (1788–1867), Pennsylvania State Senate
- E. Melvin Porter (1930–2016), Oklahoma State Senate
- Edward F. Porter (1858–1915), North Dakota State Senate
- Foster B. Porter (1891–1965), Wisconsin State Senate
- John Porter (New York politician) (1790–1874), New York State Senate
- John Porter (Pennsylvania politician), Pennsylvania State Senate
- Jon Porter (born 1955), Nevada State Senate
- King G. Porter (1921–2012), Tennessee State Senate
- Thomas F. Porter (1847–1927), Massachusetts State Senate
- Timothy H. Porter (1785–1845), New York State Senate

== See also ==
- John Porter-Porter (1855–1939), Northern Irish Senate
