= John K. Porter =

American judge

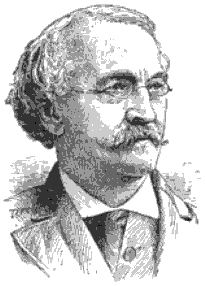
- Born: John Kilham Porter; January 12, 1819; Waterford, New York
- Died: April 11, 1892 (aged 73); Waterford, New York
- Education: Union College
- Occupations: Lawyer, politician
- Political party: Republican

John Kilham Porter (January 12, 1819 – April 11, 1892) was an American lawyer and politician from New York. He was a leading lawyer during his lifetime on the New York Bar. He was considered a remarkable crack lawyer, who was able to practice in nearly every branch of the law.

== Early life and education ==
John Kilham Porter was born on January 12, 1819, in Waterford, New York, located in Saratoga County. He was the son of Dr. Elijah Porter, a physician, who lived from 1775 to 1841, and Mary (Lawrence) Porter. Elijah was the son of Major Moses Porter, who fought in the Revolutionary War, and Sarah Killam, a direct descendant of Captain Miles Standish. Moses and Sarah had married in 1765.

In September 1835, at age sixteen, Porter entered Union College and graduated in 1837, with Phi Beta Kappa honors and membership in Kappa Alpha Society. Governor William L. Marcy, a college trustee, gave Porter a friendly commendation.

In 1844, Porter attended the Baltimore National Whig convention, that nominated Henry Clay on the presidential ticket. In 1846, Porter passed the New York Bar, ranked high among its leadership, and was admitted to practiced law before the State's Supreme Court. The same year, Porter was a delegate to the New York's Constitutional Convention.

== Legal career ==
In early 1865, Porter was appointed to the New York Court of Appeals to fill the vacancy caused by the resignation of Henry R. Selden. In November 1865, he was elected on the Republican ticket to the remaining six years of Selden's term, but resigned on December 31, 1867, and returned to private practice in New York City. In February 1876, Porter defended Grant's military secretary Orville E. Babcock, who had been indicted during prosecution of the Whiskey Ring frauds. Babcock was acquitted.

Porter helped to prosecute Charles Guiteau for the assassination of James Garfield in 1881.

== Family ==
Porter was twice married. His first marriage was in 1837, to the daughter of Hon. Eli M. Todd of Waterford, by whom he had two children, Mary, who died in 1867, and William L., a graduate of Harvard College and Harvard Law School, who was closely associated with his father during his later life. His second marriage was to Harriet, daughter of the Hon. John Cramer, also of Waterford, and who survived him after a married life of more than thirty years.

== Death and historical reputation ==
Porter died in Waterford on April 11, 1892. The New York Times said that Porter, as a lawyer, was "a laborious, keen, strongly-equipped man in nearly every branch of the law."

== Sources ==
- The Descendants of Moses and Sarah Kilham Porter of Pawlet, Vermont: with some notice of their ancestors and those of Timothy Hatch, Amy and Lucy Seymour Hatch, Mary Lawrence Porter and Lucretia Bushnell Porter by John Strachan Lawrence (F. A. Onderdonk, printer, 1911)
- Rosenblatt, Albert M. "John Kilham Porter". Historical Society of the New York Courts.
- "John K. Porter" (PDF). New York Times. April 12, 1892.
