= Lindell Hotel =

Hotel in St. Louis, Missouri, opened in 1863 and destroyed in 1867

Coordinates: 38.6307°N 90.1897°W

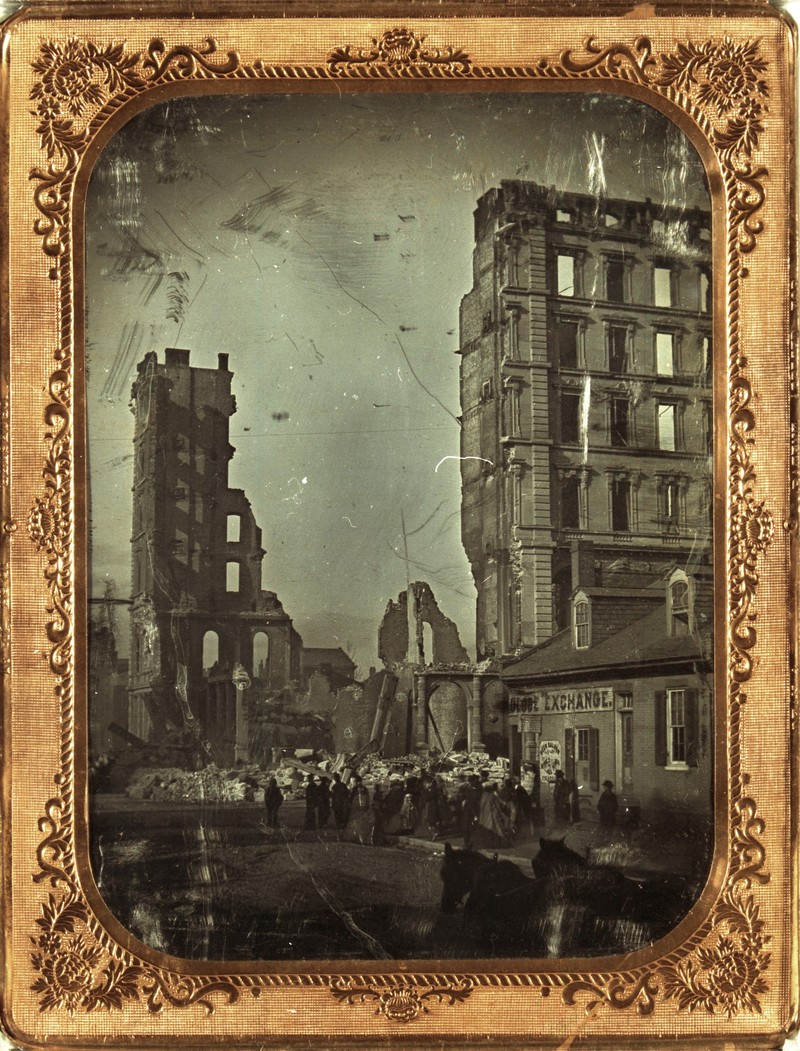
A crowd of people gather in front of the ruins of the Lindell Hotel after the fire on 30 March 1867. Two sections of the hotel rise above a pile of rubble. Two horses can be seen in the bottom-right corner. The building next to the hotel is labeled with two signs that read "Globe Exchange" and "Beer Saloon, Cigars".

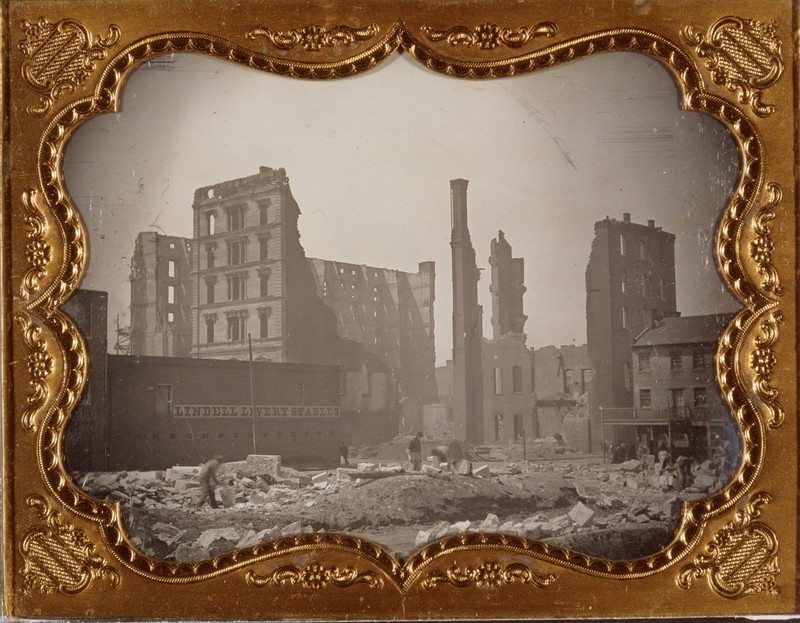
Ruins of the Lindell Hotel after the fire of 30 March 1867. Men work amongst the rubble and a horse can be seen near a building off to the left. Portions of the building still stand in the background. A brick structure next door is labeled with a sign that reads "Lindell Livery Stables", and a man leans up against it.

The Lindell Hotel was a hotel in St. Louis, Missouri, United States. Located on Sixth Street and Washington Avenue, the hotel opened in 1863 and was destroyed by fire in 1867. A new hotel was reconstructed on the same site and reopened in 1874. It was one of the largest and best-appointed hotels in the city, with 270 bedrooms, and had its own barbershop and Victorian Turkish baths.

== Construction and opening ==
The Laclede Hotel Company of St. Louis was established on March 5, 1855, by a charter from the Missouri Legislature. A lot was selected for the new hotel bounded by Washington Avenue and Green Street and Sixth and Seventh Streets. Brothers Jesse G. and Peter Lindell contributed this lot in exchange for eighty thousand dollars in Laclede Hotel Company stock and contributed ten thousand dollars to the endeavor beyond that. Although work on the hotel was to begin earlier, an economic crisis in 1857 forced work to be delayed. In 1859, another act was approved by the Legislature to build an even larger structure than was previously planned, at a cost of five hundred thousand dollars. It was at this point that the hotel was renamed to Lindell Hotel, in honor of its benefactors. Construction on the Venetian style hotel was completed in 1863. The building was six stories high and consisted of two parallel buildings with two courts in between. In 1882, guests could stay at the Lindell Hotel for $2.50 to $4.50 per day.

A grand opening ball was held on November 25. A piece composed expressly for the grand opening ball was written and performed by Waldauer & Vogel's Orchestra. The organizers sold four thousand tickets, although they were wary of inviting women for fear that some improper characters might be admitted. An article in the Missouri Republican newspaper reported on the event the next day. A mob gathered to view the guests arriving for the ball, and a rumor spread that a Chicago woman would arrive in a gown of spun glass. Over the course of the evening, guests dined on twelve hundred quail, more than two hundred turkeys, and one thousand pounds of cake. The party continued until five in the morning.

== Businesses in the hotel ==
When the hotel opened, William Roberson, a successful African-American barber, leased space in the basement to open his tonsorial parlor, or barbershop. Roberson was one of many free blacks in St. Louis at that time that ran successful businesses. Roberson renovated the hotel space at a cost of eighteen thousand dollars and hired thirty employees. The barbershop was advertised in a creative way, as Roberson had a Turkish man in a turban drive through St. Louis city streets in a gig with a bathtub mounted on top. Roberson was credited with introducing the popular Turkish bath to the Western country.

== Fire of 1867 ==
Only a few years after opening, the Lindell Hotel succumbed to fire. On March 30, 1867, a fire erupted on the upper story and quickly spread through the roof and all sides of the building. Although the fire department arrived without delay, the height of the hotel prevented firemen from throwing water on the roof. The top of the hotel was completely engulfed in flames, which spread downward throughout the structure. Luckily, because the fire started around 8:30 pm, many of the hotel's four hundred guests had not yet gone to bed. It became clear that the hotel would not be saved, so furniture and other items were taken out, and many were saved. As the fire grew worse, firemen abandoned efforts to save the Lindell Hotel and focused their efforts on saving the surrounding buildings. Around midnight, the walls of the hotel fell resulting in about nine hundred thousand dollars of damage to the building and between two and three hundred thousand dollars of furniture lost.

Stones from the remains of the original Lindell Hotel eventually made their way to St. Louis' Tower Grove Park. The hotel fire occurred shortly before Henry Shaw deeded the land that would become Tower Grove Park to the City of St. Louis. Shaw saw potential for the limestone blocks that were salvaged from the fire. The limestone was brought to the park and restacked to resemble ancient ruins, according to a plan drawn up by Shaw and horticulturist James Gurney. This type of arrangement modeled on ancient ruins was common at the time, as European grand tours gained popularity.

== Second Lindell Hotel ==
Almost immediately after the fire, citizens began assembling to discuss rebuilding the hotel. It was debated whether the building should stand on the hotel's old site or to the west, on the same street. Mrs. Vincent Marmaduke resolved to rebuild the hotel on its original site. George I. Barnett was selected as the architect for the new building and work began on September 1, 1872, with the clearing of rubble from the fire. Construction took two years, and the new hotel was opened on September 28, 1874. The new hotel had two hundred and seventy guest rooms, with more room devoted to public use than the old structure.

The Lindell Hotel offered some unique amenities for the late 1870s, including steam heat, lace curtains, and an electric massage bath. Guests could also choose from cold water, Russian, or Turkish baths. The barbershop in the hotel was very popular and employed a dozen premier barbers. One barber working there made $2,000 a month in 1870s dollars and served 600 regular customers from all over the city.

== Demolition ==
The hotel was demolished in June 1905 to make way for the Grand-Leader Dry Goods Store.
