= Wilmot Mansion =

Historic house in Pennsylvania, United States

- U.S. National Register of Historic Places
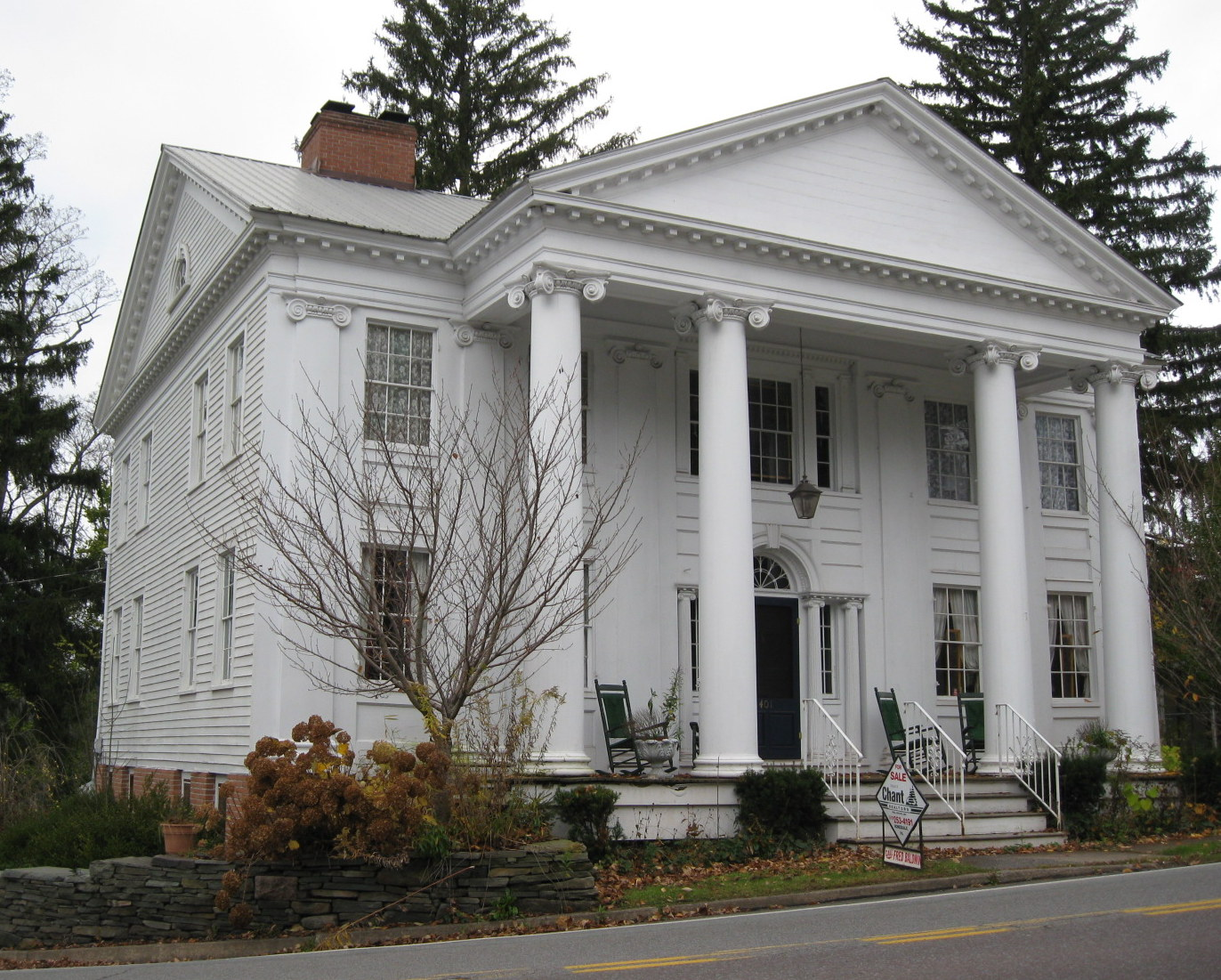
- Wilmot Mansion, October 2009

- Location within Pennsylvania Location within the United States
- Location: Wayne and Sugar Sts., Bethany, Pennsylvania
- Coordinates: 41°36′47″N 75°17′6″W
- Area: 1 acre (0.40 ha)
- Built: 1827
- Architectural style: Greek Revival
- NRHP reference No.: 78003172
- Added to NRHP: January 26, 1978

Wilmot Mansion is a historic home located at Bethany, Wayne County, Pennsylvania. It was built in 1827, and is a two-story, wood-frame dwelling in the Greek Revival style. It features a pedimented portico supported by four columns. It was the boyhood home of Congressman, Senator, and abolition advocate David Wilmot (1814-1868).

It was added to the National Register of Historic Places in 1978.
