= George Andrews (judge) =

American judge (1826–1889)

George Andrews (December 28, 1826 – August 22, 1889) was a justice of the Tennessee Supreme Court from 1868 to 1870.

Born in Vermont, Andrews was appointed to the Tennessee Supreme Court by Governor William G. Brownlow in 1868. Andrews was one of the judges serving on the highly partisan "apocryphal" court, which was in place in Tennessee between the end of the American Civil War and the enactment of the Constitution of 1870. The justices who served on this court "without exception, were bitter partisans" who "had all been Union men, and... took the partisan view of all questions growing out of the war". Of this group, Andrews is described as one of only two "who were men of talent, and were good lawyers", the other being Samuel Milligan.

He later served as the United States attorney for the Eastern District of Tennessee, and as a member of the Board of Trustees of the University of Tennessee.

Andrews was killed in a train wreck in Knoxville, Tennessee in 1889, along with several other prominent men.

Political offices
Preceded by Horace Maynard	Justice of the Tennessee Supreme Court; 1868–1870	Succeeded by Court reconstituted
