= Anti-Moiety Acts =

Series of American legislations

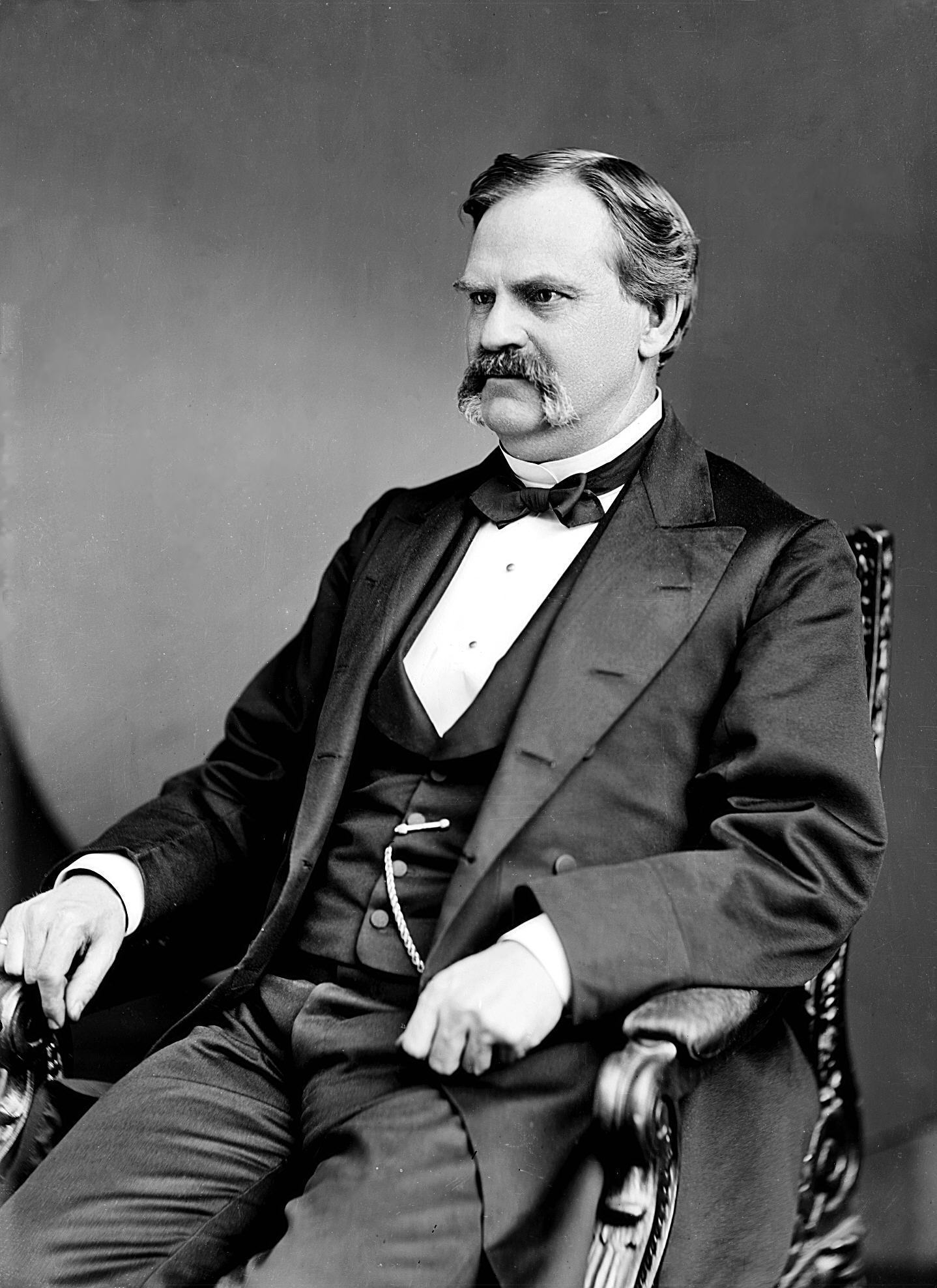
Secretary of Treasury William A. Richardson

President Ulysses S. Grant signed a series of laws during his first and second terms that limited the number of special tax agents and prevented or reduced the collection of delinquent taxes under a commissions or moiety system. The public outcry over the Sanborn incident caused the Grant administration to abolish the practice of appointing special treasury agents to collect commissions or moieties on delinquent taxes.

== Revenue Act of 1872 ==
In 1872, President Ulysses S. Grant signed into law the Revenue Act, which restricted the number of informers who collected taxes from delinquent taxpayers and who received a percentage of commissions, known as moieties, from the collected taxes. This was the first restriction of the federal moiety system that had been authorized by Congress in 1853. The Revenue Act of 1872 was considered a first step towards Civil Service Reform by President Ulysses S. Grant. The Revenue Act restricted the U.S. Treasury Department to contract to no more than three informers to collect taxes from delinquent taxpayers or businesses. The law was initially designed to prevent or reduce the number of false accusations and blackmail by the informers appointed by the Secretary of Treasury to collect taxes. The appointed informers were to receive a percentage of delinquent taxes collected. Grant's Secretary of Treasury George S. Boutwell made the initial informer collector contracts.

== Sanborn incident ==
In August 1872 acting Secretary of Treasury William A. Richardson contracted informer collector John D. Sanborn who would receive 50% commissions from delinquent taxes collected from railroads, distillers, and others. Secretary Boutwell had been elected to the Senate. An 1874 House Ways and Means Committee revealed that Richardson had authorized regular treasury collector agents to reduce their amount of regular collections so Sanborn could receive more delinquent accounts. Sanborn immediately began to collect taxes by intimidation, receiving upwards of $420,000 in profit commissions which he split with unknown partners. Sanborn himself retained $213,000 in profits. The investigation revealed that the whole power of the Internal Revenue Bureau was placed under the authority of Sanborn. During the investigation, Grant quietly appointed Richardson to the Court of Claims and replaced him with Benjamin H. Bristow.

== Revenue Act of 1874 ==
Concerned over the public outcry over the Sanborn incident, President Grant on June 22, 1874, signed a bill into law that completely put an end to the moiety contract system prohibiting the Secretary of Treasury to appoint special agent moiety Treasury collectors.
