= Samuel Milligan =

American judge (1814–1874)

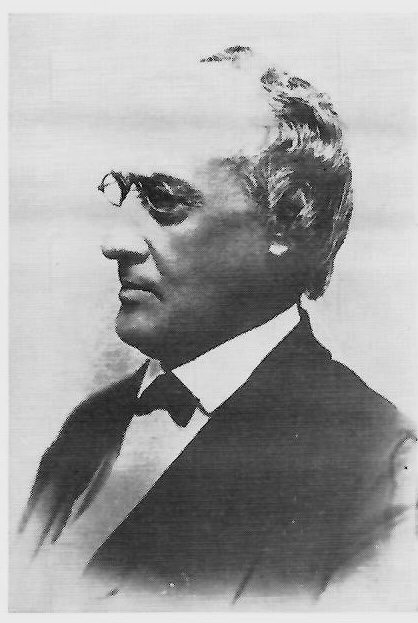

Judge of the Court of Claims
- In office July 25, 1868 – April 20, 1874
- Appointed by: Andrew Johnson
- Preceded by: David Wilmot
- Succeeded by: William Adams Richardson

Personal details
- Born: Samuel Milligan; November 16, 1814 Greene County, Tennessee
- Died: April 20, 1874 (aged 59) Washington, D.C.
- Party: Democratic
- Education: Greeneville College; Tusculum College read law

Samuel Milligan (November 16, 1814 – April 20, 1874) was a justice of the Tennessee Supreme Court and a judge of the Court of Claims. He was a close friend and confidant of President Andrew Johnson.

== Education and career ==
Born on November 16, 1814, in Greene County, Tennessee, Milligan attended Greeneville College, and after its merger with Tusculum College, graduated from that institution in 1843. He was a classmate of future judge and historian Oliver Perry Temple. He read law with Robert J. McKinney in Greeneville, Tennessee in 1846. A Democrat, Milligan was elected to the Tennessee House of Representatives for three terms, from 1841 to 1846 (24th, 25th, and 26th General Assemblies). He represented Greene and Washington Counties in the 24th General Assembly, but, following redistricting, represented only Greene County in the 25th and 26th. During his time in the state legislature, Milligan developed a close friendship with future President Andrew Johnson. He entered private practice in Greeneville from 1846 to 1847. He was a major in the United States Army Quartermaster Corps in 1848. He resumed private practice in Greeneville from 1848 to 1860. He was editor of the Greeneville Spy in 1849. He was appointed Inspector General of the state militia by then-Governor Johnson in 1853, and represented Tennessee on a commission to resolve a boundary dispute with Virginia in 1858. He was a justice of the Tennessee Supreme Court in 1860, and from 1864 to 1868. He was a delegate to the Peace Conference of 1861 in Washington, D.C. During the American Civil War, he remained loyal to the Union, and was present at the pro-Union East Tennessee Convention in April 1864.

In his second appointment to the Supreme Court, Milligan served on the highly partisan "apocryphal" court, which was in place in Tennessee between the end of the Civil War and the enactment of the Constitution of 1870. The justices who served on this court "without exception, were bitter partisans" who "had all been Union men, and... took the partisan view of all questions growing out of the war". Of this group, Milligan is described as one of only two "who were men of talent, and were good lawyers", the other being George Andrews.

== Federal judicial service ==
Milligan was nominated by President Andrew Johnson on July 23, 1868, to a seat on the Court of Claims (later the United States Court of Claims) vacated by Judge David Wilmot. He was confirmed by the United States Senate on July 25, 1868, and received his commission the same day. His service terminated on April 20, 1874, due to his death in Washington, D.C.

== Sources ==
- "Milligan, Samuel - Federal Judicial Center". www.fjc.gov.

Legal offices
Preceded by David Wilmot	Judge of the Court of Claims; 1868–1874	Succeeded by William Adams Richardson
