= Wilmot House =

Historic house in Pennsylvania, United States

- U.S. National Register of Historic Places
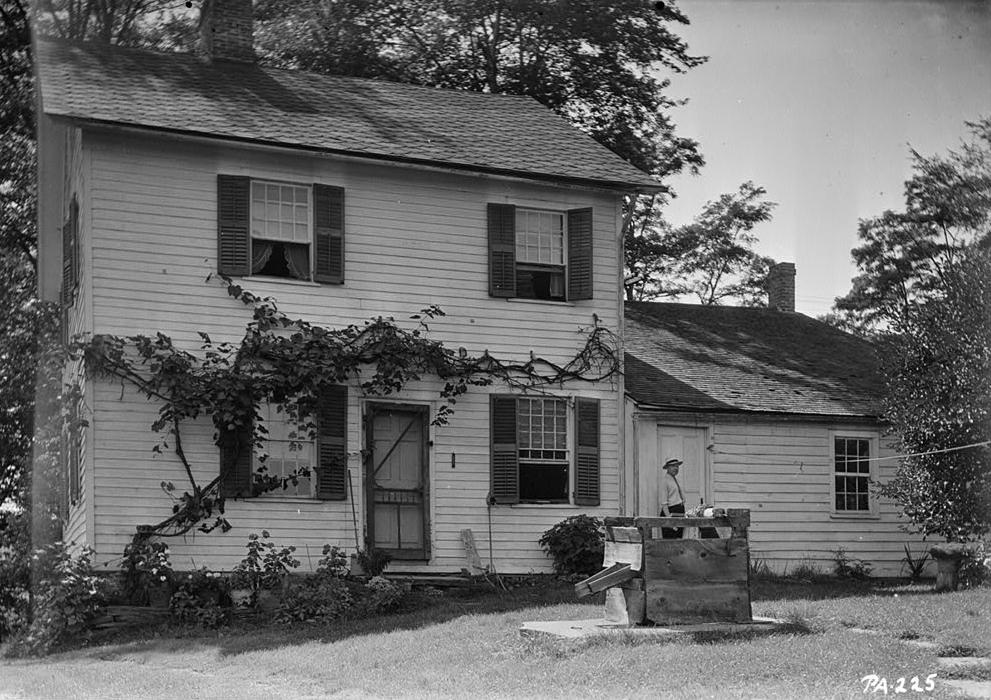
- Wilmot House, HABS Photo, October 1936

- Location within Pennsylvania Location within the United States
- Location: Wayne St., Bethany, Pennsylvania
- Coordinates: 41°36′46″N 75°17′3″W
- Area: less than one acre
- Built: c. 1811
- NRHP reference No.: 74001815
- Added to NRHP: February 15, 1974

Wilmot House, also known as David Wilmot House, is a historic home located at Bethany, Wayne County, Pennsylvania. It was built about 1811, and is a 2 1/2-story, wood-frame dwelling in the style of a New England farmhouse. It is three bays wide and two bays deep and has a medium pitch gable roof. It has a 1 1/2-story addition with a saltbox roof. Congressman, Senator, and abolition advocate David Wilmot (1814-1868) was born in the house in 1814.

It was added to the National Register of Historic Places in 1974.
