= Bethany, Pennsylvania =

Borough in Pennsylvania, US

- Borough
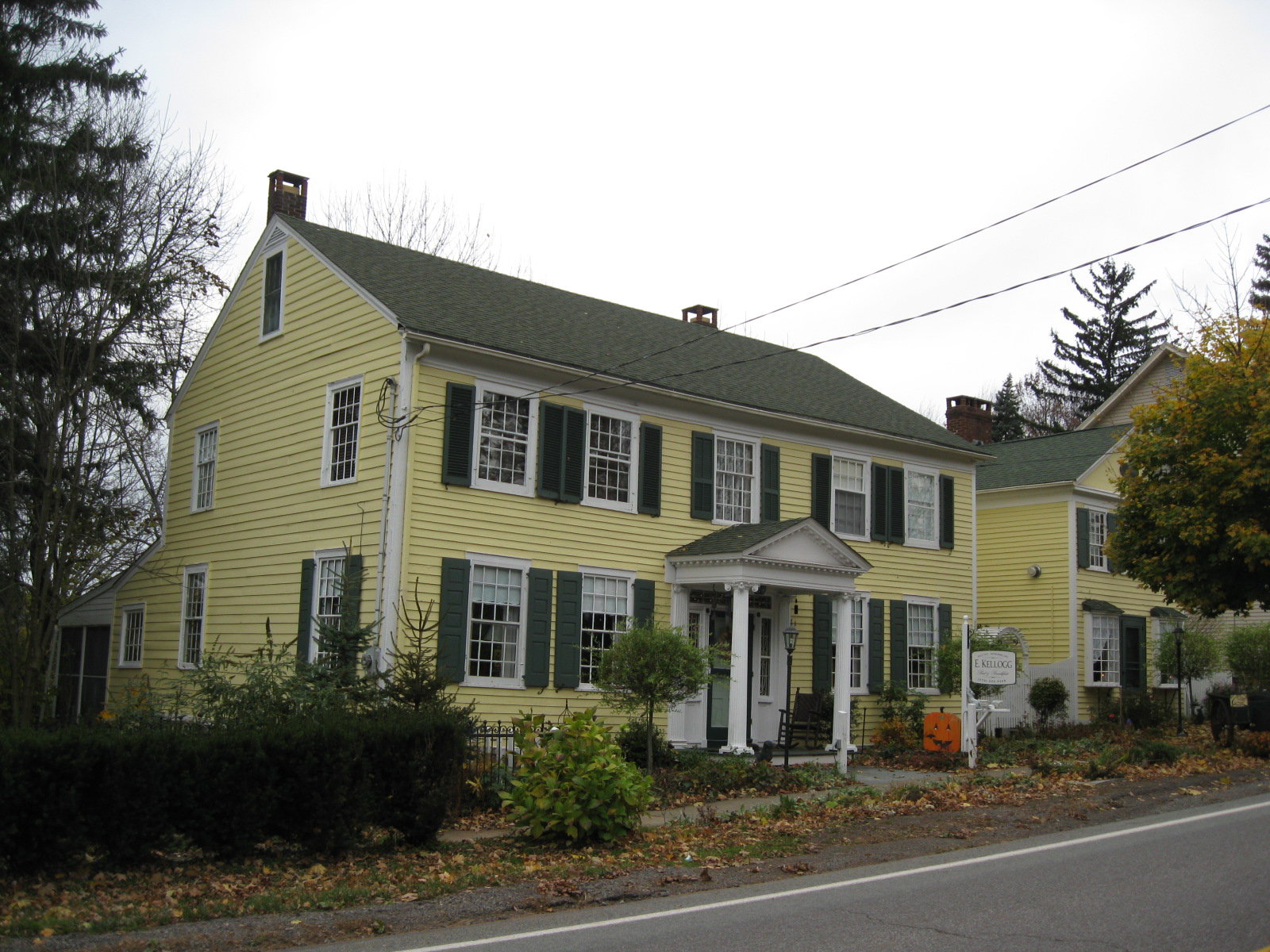
- Bethany, Pennsylvania

- Location in Wayne County and the U.S. state of Pennsylvania.

- Location of Bethany in Pennsylvania Bethany (the United States)
- Coordinates: 41°36′52″N 75°17′19″W
- Country: United States
- State: Pennsylvania
- County: Wayne

Area
  - Total: 0.50 sq mi (1.30 km^{2})
  - Land: 0.50 sq mi (1.29 km^{2})
  - Water: 0.0039 sq mi (0.01 km^{2})
- Elevation: 1,486 ft (453 m)

Population (2020)
  - Total: 241
  - Density: 484.3/sq mi (186.99/km^{2})
- Time zone: UTC-5 (EST)
  - Summer (DST): UTC-4 (EDT)
- Postal code: 18431
- Area code: 570
- FIPS code: 42-05976
- Website: Bethany Borough

Bethany is a borough in Wayne County, Pennsylvania, United States. The borough's population was 241 at the time of the 2020 United States Census.

== History ==
The borough was named after Bethany, a place mentioned in the Bible.

The Wilmot House and Wilmot Mansion are listed on the National Register of Historic Places.

== Geography ==
Bethany is located at 41°36′52″N 75°17′19″W (41.614321, -75.288537).

According to the United States Census Bureau, the borough has a total area of 0.5 square miles (1.3 km^{2}), all land.

== Demographics ==
Historical population
Census	Pop.	Note	%±
1830	327		—
1840	299		−8.6%
1850	295		−1.3%
1860	225		−23.7%
1870	202		−10.2%
1880	181		−10.4%
1890	134		−26.0%
1900	130		−3.0%
1910	130		0.0%
1920	106		−18.5%
1930	146		37.7%
1940	148		1.4%
1950	148		0.0%
1960	181		22.3%
1970	267		47.5%
1980	282		5.6%
1990	238		−15.6%
2000	292		22.7%
2010	246		−15.8%
2020	241		−2.0%

As of the census of 2020, there were 241 people, 122 housing units, and 112 families residing in the borough. The racial makeup of the borough was 95% White, <.1% African American, 1.6% Asian, and no American Indian or Alaska Native. Hispanic or Latino of any race were also 1.6% of the population.

There were 120 households, out of which 19.3% had children under the age of 18 living with them, 64.2% were married couples living together, 13.3% had a female household with no husband present, 14.2% had a male household with no spouse present, and 26.1% were non-families. The average family size was 2.52.

In the borough the population was spread out, with 19.3% under the age of 18, 48% from 18 to 64, and 32.7% who were 65 years of age or older. The median age was 41 years.

The median income for a household in the borough was $95,167 and the median income for a family was $96,917. Only 1.6% of the population was below the poverty line, all being 18–64 years of age.

== Education ==
The school district is the Wayne Highlands School District.

== Notable people ==
- John Azor Kellogg, military leader and Wisconsin politician
- David Wilmot, politician
- George Washington Woodward, failed nominee to the Supreme Court, member of the US House of Representatives
