= Grantism =

Political controversies of Ulysses S. Grant

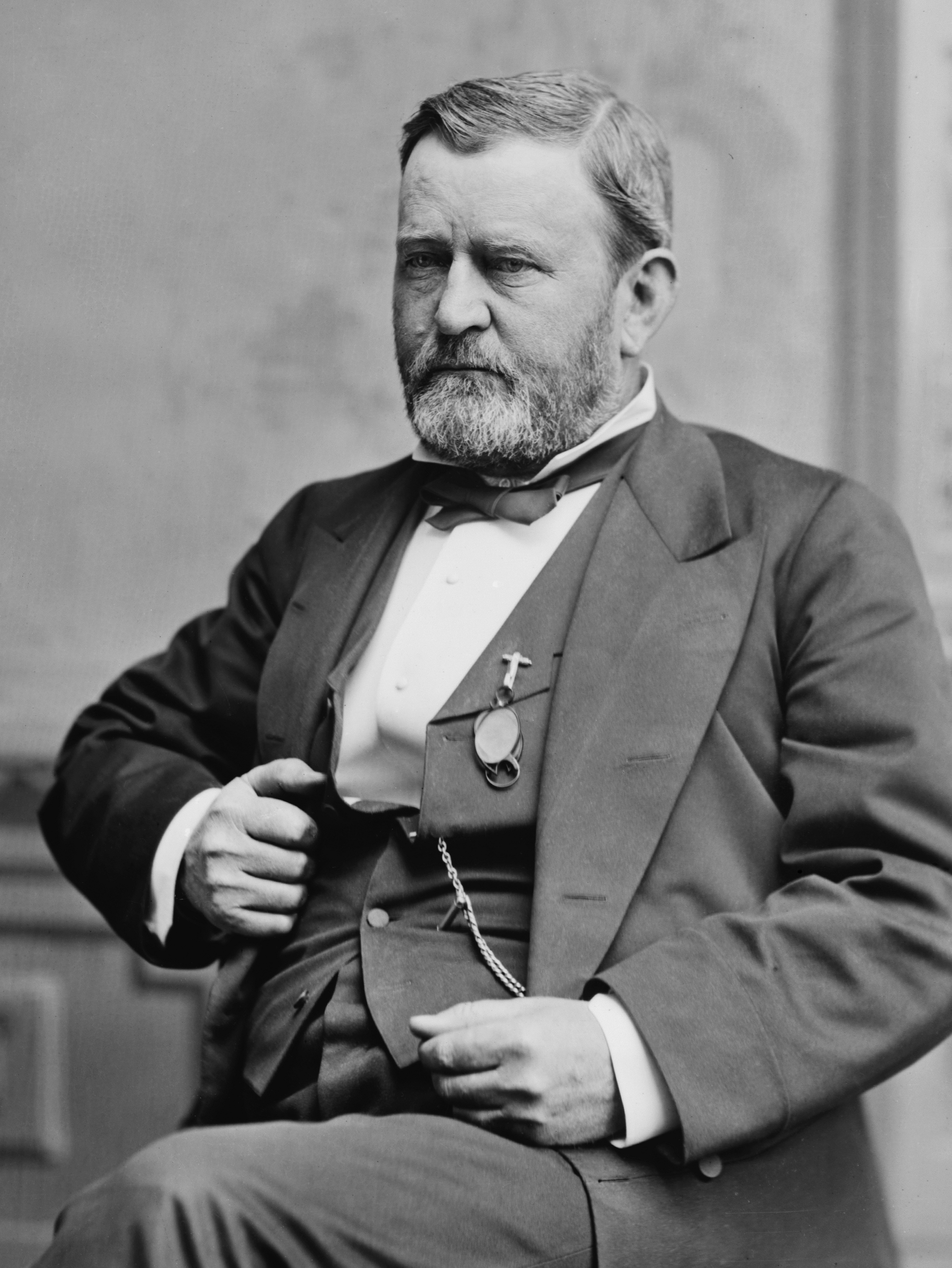
Ulysses S. Grant, after whom Grantism is named

Grantism is a derisive term of United States origin referring to the political incompetence, corruption, and fraud, during the administration of President Ulysses S. Grant. His presidency, which lasted from 1869 to 1877, was marred by many scandals and fraudulent activities associated with persons within his administration, including his cabinet, which was in continual transition, divided by the forces of political corruption and reform. Among them were: Black Friday, corruption in the Department of the Interior, the Sanborn incident, and the Whiskey Ring. (The Crédit Mobilier scandal, although exposed during his tenure, is not considered a Grant scandal.)

Political opponents of Grant and proponents of the Lost Cause of the Confederacy attacked him with the term Grantism. Some historians defend Grant, noting that he established the Civil Service Commission, had reformers in his Cabinet, and ended the corrupt system of privateer tax collectors profiteering by taking a percentage of delinquent taxes. His enemies wanted to undermine the moral integrity of his administration and attacked him for his enforcement of African American civil rights during Reconstruction.

Grant, ever trusting of associates, was himself influenced by both forces. The standards in many of his appointments were low, and charges of corruption were widespread. Although he was not directly involved with these scandals, the president's associations with people of questionable character and his reliance on cronyism, nepotism, and political patronage gave rise to accusations of "Grantism". Historians agree that corruption in the Grant administration was due to Grant's appointments of unqualified close friends and family members, and remain perplexed why he protected his personal secretary Orville E. Babcock.

== Origins ==
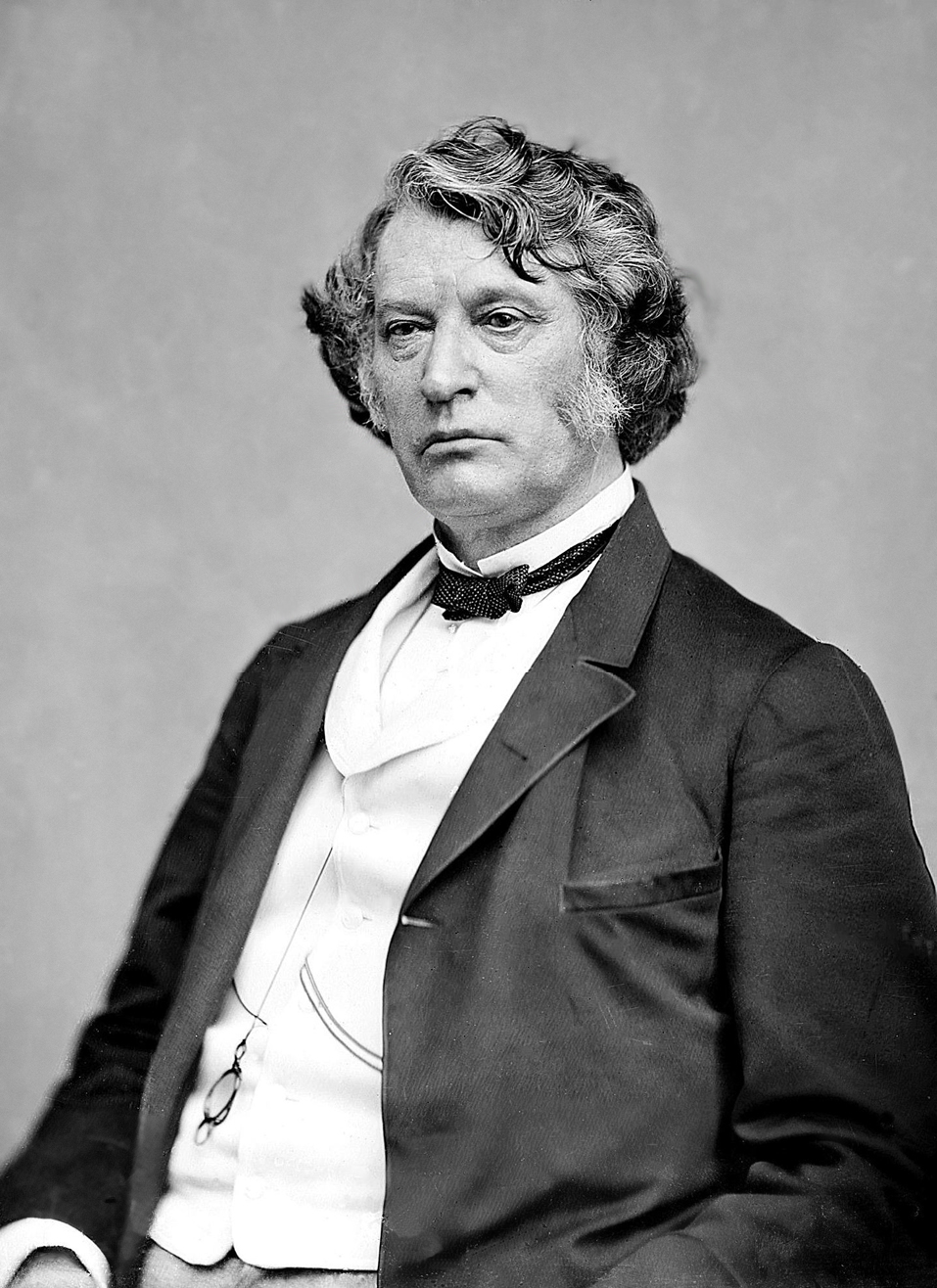
U.S. Senator Charles Sumner (1851–1874) in a photograph by Mathew Brady, 1865

The term "Grantism" was originally coined by a fellow Republican, Senator Charles Sumner of Massachusetts, in a speech on May 31, 1872, a presidential election year. It was used by Sumner to differentiate the Republican Party from Grant. The two men had been political enemies ever since Sumner's refusal to annex Santo Domingo to the United States. Sumner accused Grant of political patronage, nepotism, and being an autocrat like Julius Caesar.

Sumner charged that Grant had hindered African American national sovereignty rights in the Caribbean with the proposal for the annexation of Santo Domingo. Sumner was also angry that Grant used his personal secretary to establish international relations with Santo Domingo, rather than acting through the State Department and Congress. Sumner summed up Grantism as a despotic government of "one man and his personal will". The lengthy speech was used as the political platform for the Liberal Republican Party and launched the short-lived political career of Horace Greeley as the party's presidential candidate in the 1872 United States presidential election.

== Grant as reformer ==
Historian Louis Arthur Coolidge noted that although Grant had critics, including Sumner, concerning presidential patronage, he was the first president to advocate and sign into law civil service reform legislation, doing the latter on March 4, 1871. Grant said that the "elevation and purification of civil service of the government will be hailed with approval by the whole people of the United States". The historians H. Wayne Morgan and Ari Hoogenboom say that Grant's presidential reputation for corruption has been exaggerated. Grant placed leading reformer George William Curtis as head of the civil service commission set up to establish regulations, in order to ensure the best person qualified would hold office. In addition to signing the civil service reform, Grant first limited and eventually abolished the moiety system in which private citizens contracted as Treasury revenue agents and received a percentage of delinquent taxes assessed and collected.

== Modern definitions ==
The Liberal Republicans called corruption in government "Grantism" from 1873 until 1875. The Liberal Republicans ceased to exist after the reforming Democratic Party assumed a majority in the United States House of Representatives from 1875 to 1881. After assuming control of the House for the 44th Congress, the Democrats launched a series of corruption investigations into the Grant administration from 1875 to 1876. Today, "Grantism" is defined as any political corruption and greed in government. During Grant's presidency, many of his associates took part in price skimming and tax evasion. More generally, "Grantism" may also refer to "big business" undermining democratic control of local and national government.
