= Sanborn incident =

1874 American political scandal

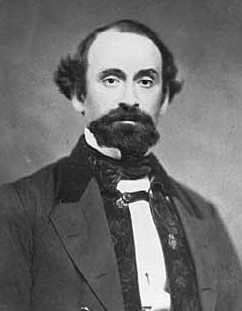
John B. Sanborn

The Sanborn incident or Sanborn contract was an American political scandal which occurred in 1874. William Adams Richardson, President Ulysses S. Grant's Secretary of the Treasury, hired a private citizen, John B. Sanborn, a former Union general, to collect $427,000 in unpaid taxes. Richardson agreed Sanborn could keep half of what he collected. After extorting money from companies to pay back taxes by falsely making claims of tax evasion, Sanborn kept $213,000, of which $156,000 went to his various assistants. After an investigation by the Treasury Department discovered the corruption, President Grant signed legislation making the practice illegal.

== History ==
In 1872, lawmakers allowed the Bureau of Internal Revenue (BIR) to hire private citizens to assist the Government to discover and collect any money belonging to the United States. BIR did not develop any plans for the private collectors. There were several influential Massachusetts politicians, most of them in key positions in Washington; such as Treasury Secretary George S. Boutwell; William A. Richardson (Boutwell's successor); and Benjamin Franklin Butler.

Sanborn began his efforts focusing on whiskey taxes. Treasury officials requested collection of unpaid taxes from 39 delinquent distillers and liquor retailers. Sanborn was widely successful in his efforts, and persuaded supervisors to extend his mandate. By late 1872, the department had added over 750 taxpayers to Sanborn's list of delinquents. In the early 1873, they appended another 2,000 delinquent names to his list. Finally, on July 1, 1873, 592 railroad companies were added to Sanborn's list.

Sanborn had an incredible incentive to add names to his contract: under the agreements with officials, he would receive 50% of any money collected from delinquent taxpayers named in his contract. By falsely accusing companies of tax evasion, he was able to extort large sums of money from them.

== Frauds ==
Sanborn expanded his operations, the Treasury accepting his list with little or no evaluations. Private collectors were required, by law, to furnish details about each collection, such as the nature of the debt and the evidence used to support accusations. Traditionally, the government would hire contractors to assist its officials in collecting taxes. Sanborn viciously turned the system, and assured full-time government employees would work for him.

BIR officials were required to give the contractor all the help and assistance necessary, BIR employees would assist Sanborn to analyze several railroad companies. About this time, Congress had delivered the contractor another 150 delinquent accounts. In July 1873, Sanborn extended the contract by 150 companies. Meanwhile, he convinced Congress to allow him take over all of the railroad companies within the United States. Sanborn was trying to collect taxes that BIR employees were also pursuing, causing great disturbance among the employees. Also, the commissioners had lodged a formal complaint with the Treasury, which was ignored by the same.

On January 10, 1874, Sanborn and two others were indicted for revenue fraud. Sanborn's defense was that he was under contract from the government due to a rider in an 1872 appropriations bill created by congressman William H. Kelsey. This bill allowed the Secretary of the Treasury to hire three persons to "discover and collect" unknown taxes to the United States government. If they collected, they would receive a 50% commission. Previously, acting Treasury Secretary William Adams Richardson hired Sanborn as an independent tax collector on a 50 percent commission basis, known as a moiety. What Sanborn did instead was to take already existing tax cases and put them on his contract, so when they came in, he would collect 50%. When the charges came, Congress investigated the documents. In the following testimony, Richardson said he didn't read the contracts, but he resigned few months later. Sanborn was acquitted of the charges because he was under contract to collect those taxes, but the scandal still rocked the country from January to May 1874. In June 1874, Grant signed the Anti-Moiety Acts, abolishing that system.

== See also ==
- Grantism
- Bibliography of Ulysses S. Grant

== Sources ==
- Chernow, Ron (2018) [2017]. Grant. New York: Penguin Press. ISBN 978-1-5942-0487-6.
- McFeely, William S. (1974). "Ulysses S. Grant". In Woodward, C. Vann (ed.). Responses of the Presidents to Charges of Misconduct. Dell Publishing. pp. 115–140. ISBN 978-0-440-05923-3.
- McFeely, William S. (1981). Grant: A Biography. Norton. ISBN 0-393-01372-3.
- Smith, Jean Edward (2001). Grant. New York: Simon & Schuster. ISBN 0-684-84927-5.
- White, Ronald C. (2016). American Ulysses: A Life of Ulysses S. Grant. Random House Publishing Group. ISBN 978-1-5883-6992-5.
