= David Wilmot (politician) =

American politician and judge (1814–1868)

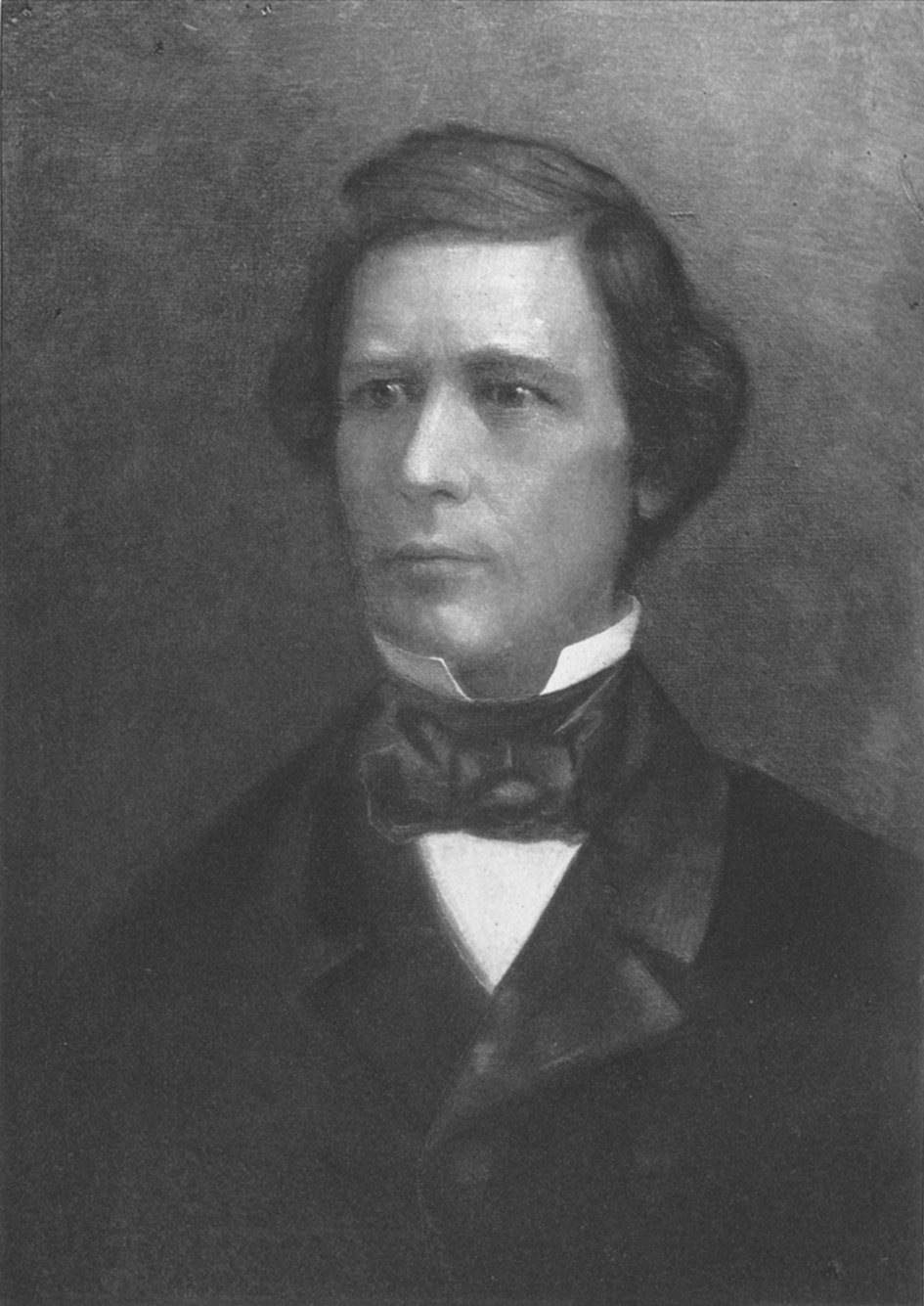

Judge of the Court of Claims
- In office March 7, 1863 – March 16, 1868
- Appointed by: Abraham Lincoln
- Preceded by: Seat established by 12 Stat. 765
- Succeeded by: Samuel Milligan

United States Senator from Pennsylvania
- In office March 14, 1861 – March 3, 1863
- Preceded by: Simon Cameron
- Succeeded by: Charles R. Buckalew

Member of the U.S. House of Representatives from Pennsylvania's 12th district
- In office March 4, 1845 – March 3, 1851
- Preceded by: George Fuller
- Succeeded by: Galusha A. Grow

Personal details
- Born: January 20, 1814 Bethany, Pennsylvania, U.S.
- Died: March 16, 1868 (aged 54) Towanda, Pennsylvania, U.S.
- Resting place: Riverside Cemetery; Towanda, Pennsylvania
- Party: Democratic (until 1848); Free Soil (1848–1854); Republican (1854–1868)
- Spouse: Anna Morgan (m. 1836)
- Children: 3
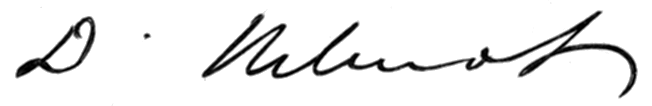
- Signature

David Wilmot (January 20, 1814 – March 16, 1868) was an American politician and judge from Pennsylvania who served in the U.S. House of Representatives and U.S. Senate, and as a judge of the Court of Claims. He is best known for being the prime sponsor and eponym of the Wilmot Proviso, a failed legislative proposal to ban the expansion of slavery into western territories gained in the Mexican Cession. A northern Democrat when he introduced and supported the Proviso, he subsequently became a notable member of the anti-slavery Free Soil Party. Later, Wilmot was instrumental in establishing the Pennsylvania Republican Party.

== Early life and education ==
Wilmot was born on January 20, 1814, in Bethany, Pennsylvania. He completed preparatory studies at the local Beech Woods Academy and the Cayuga Lake Academy in Aurora, Cayuga County, New York. He then read law with Pennsylvania state judge William Jessup in Montrose, Pennsylvania, and with George Washington Woodward in Wilkes-Barre, Pennsylvania, in August 1834. Wilmot was admitted to the bar of Bradford County, Pennsylvania, and entered private practice in Towanda, from 1834 to 1844.

== Congressional service ==
Wilmot was elected as a Democrat from Pennsylvania's 12th congressional district to the United States House of Representatives of the 29th, 30th, and 31st United States Congresses, serving from March 4, 1845 to March 3, 1851.

=== Introducing the Wilmot Proviso ===
Upon taking his seat in Congress, Wilmot initially supported the policies of Democratic president James K. Polk. He also became part of an informal group of anti-slavery Democrats led by New York Congressman Preston King, who was a protégé of New York governor Silas Wright and an ally of former president Martin Van Buren. Although Wilmot opposed the extension of slavery into the territories, he was generally considered to be a Democratic Party loyalist; he supported Polk in the initiation of the Mexican–American War and was the lone House Democrat from Pennsylvania to vote for the Walker tariff. However, during Polk's presidency, anti-slavery Northern Democrats increasingly came to view Polk as unduly favorable to Southern interests. They were specifically disappointed by Polk's decision to compromise with Britain over the partition of Oregon, as well as Polk's veto of an internal improvements bill. As James G. Blaine later wrote:

"David Wilmot represented a district which had always given Democratic majorities and was himself an intense partisan of that political school. He was a man of strong physique and strong common sense; of phlegmatic temperament, without any pretension to genius; a sensible speaker, with no claim to eloquence or oratory. But he had courage, determination, and honesty".

In August 1846, an appropriations bill for $2 million to be used by the President in negotiating a treaty of peace with Mexico was introduced in the House. Wilmot immediately offered the following amendment:

"Provided, That, as an express and fundamental condition to the acquisition of any territory from the Republic of Mexico by the United States, by virtue of any treaty which may be negotiated between them, and to the use by the Executive of the moneys herein appropriated, neither slavery nor involuntary servitude shall ever exist in any part of said territory, except for crime, whereof the party shall first be duly convicted."

Wilmot modeled the language for what would usually be referred to as the Wilmot Proviso after the Northwest Ordinance of 1787. Unlike some Northern Whigs, Wilmot and other anti-slavery Democrats were largely unconcerned by the issue of racial equality, and instead opposed the expansion of slavery because they believed the institution was detrimental to the "laboring white man". Historian Sean Wilentz writes that it is unclear why Wilmot, an "unremarkable" first-term Congressman, was the one to introduce the measure. Wilmot would later claim that he had introduced the proviso independent of any other members of Congress, while Congressman Jacob Brinkerhoff claimed that he was the true author of the proviso. Wilentz speculates that the proviso was jointly drafted by Wilmot and other anti-slavery Democrats, and that the drafters agreed that whoever had the first opportunity to introduce the proviso would do so.

In a February 1847 debate over the Proviso, Wilmot explained that he was not an abolitionist, and was not seeking to abolish slavery in the Southern states, but simply wanted to preserve the integrity of free territories that did not have slavery and did not want it:

"We ask that this Government protect the integrity of free territory against the aggressions of slavery—against its wrongful usurpations. Sir, I was in favor of the annexation of Texas. I supported it with the whole influence which I possessed, and I was willing to take Texas in as she was. I sought not to change the character of her institutions. Texas was a slave country. We voted for the annexation of Texas. The Democracy of the North was for it, to a man. We are for it now—firmly for it. Sir, we are fighting this war for Texas, and for the South. I affirm it; here is a matter well known to the Union. Now, sir, we are told that California is ours; and so it is. I intend to refer more particularly to this subject before I conclude. But, we are told, California is ours. And all we ask in the North is, that the character of its territory be preserved. It is free; and it is part of the established law of nations, and all public law, that when it shall come in to this Union, all laws there existing, not inconsistent with its new allegiance, will remain in force. This fundamental law, which prohibits slavery in California, will be in force; this fundamental law, which prohibits slavery in New Mexico, will be in force. Shall the South invade it? Shall the South make this Government an instrument for the violation of its neutrality, and for the establishment of slavery in these territories, in defiance of law? That is the question. There is no question of abolition here, sir. It is a question whether the South shall be permitted, by aggression, by invasion of right, by subduing free territory and planting slavery upon it, to wrest this territory to the accomplishment of its own sectional purposes and schemes? That is the question. And shall we of the North submit to it? Must we yield this? It is not, sir, in the spirit of the compact; it is not, sir, in the Constitution."

In an 1848 speech, Wilmot responded to critics who called him a radical abolitionist by pointing to Thomas Jefferson's proposed Land Ordinance of 1784, which would have banned slavery in a large portion of western territory slated for federal expansion.

"This sir, looks very much like the 'Proviso.' Here is the original "firebrand"—the heresy, for holding onto which men are now proscribed by the government of their country. Mr. Jefferson, had he lived at this day, would have been denounced as an abolitionist, and a disturber of the peace of the Union."

The House, after first voting down a counter-proposal simply to extend the Missouri Compromise line across the Mexican Cession, passed the proviso by a vote of 83–64. This led to an attempt to table the entire appropriations bill rather than pass it with "the obnoxious proviso attached", but this effort was defeated "in an ominously sectional vote, 78–94". The U.S. Senate adjourned rather than approve the bill with the proviso.

=== Free Soil movement ===
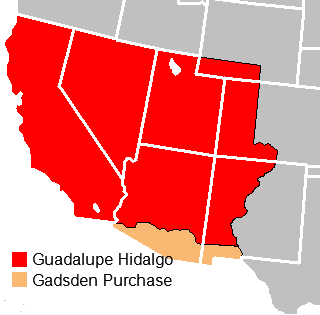
Wilmot and other Free Soilers sought to exclude slavery from the Mexican Cession (red), which was acquired from Mexico in the 1848 Treaty of Guadalupe Hidalgo.

A measure to the Wilmot Proviso was brought forward at the next session of Congress, with the appropriation amount increased to $3 million, and the scope of the amendment expanded to include all future territory which might be acquired by the United States. This was passed in the House by a vote of 115 to 105, but the Senate refused to concur and passed a bill of its own without the amendment. The House acquiesced, owing largely to the influence of general Lewis Cass. As the 1848 presidential election took shape, the Democrats rejected the Wilmot Proviso in their platform and selected Cass as their candidate to run on a popular sovereignty platform. The new Free Soil Party rallied around the Wilmot Proviso, and nominated Van Buren on a platform calling for "No more slave states and no more slave territory."

By 1848 Wilmot was thoroughly identified as a Free Soiler, but, like many other Free Soilers, he did not oppose the expansion of slavery based on a legal rejection of the short-term existence of the institution itself, but rather because he felt slavery was detrimental to the interests of whites. In fact, he sometimes referred to the Wilmot proviso as the "White Man's Proviso". In a speech in the House, Wilmot said, "I plead the cause and the rights of white freemen [and] I would preserve to free white labor a fair country, a rich inheritance, where the sons of toil, of my own race and own color, can live without the disgrace which association with negro slavery brings upon free labor." Around the same time, however, Wilmot, in a New York speech, spoke of the ultimate demise of slavery when he argued, "Keep it within given limits ...and in time it will wear itself out. Its existence can only be perpetuated by constant expansion. ... Slavery has within itself the seeds of its own destruction."

Wilmot was presented as the Free Soil candidate for speaker of the United States House of Representatives in 1849 and was soon at odds with the mainstream Pennsylvania Democratic Party led by James Buchanan. Wilmot was forced to withdraw from the 1850 congressional elections in favor of the more moderate Galusha A. Grow.

== State judicial service ==
Wilmot was president judge of the Pennsylvania courts of common pleas for the thirteenth district from 1851 to 1861. He took a leading part in the founding of the Republican Party in 1854. He was the chairman of the Republican Party platform committee, was a delegate to the 1856 Republican National Convention, and worked vigorously for the first Republican presidential candidate, John C. Frémont, in the 1856 election. He was an unsuccessful Republican candidate for governor of Pennsylvania in 1857, losing to Democrat William F. Packer.

== Later congressional service ==
Wilmot was elected as a Republican to the U.S. Senate to fill the vacancy caused by the resignation of Simon Cameron. He served from March 14, 1861 to March 3, 1863. He was not a candidate for reelection in 1862. He was a member of the Peace Conference of 1861, held in Washington, D.C., in an effort to devise means to prevent the impending American Civil War.

== Federal judicial service ==
Wilmot was nominated by president Abraham Lincoln on March 6, 1863, to the Court of Claims, to a new seat authorized by 12 Stat. 765. He was confirmed by the U.S. Senate on March 7, 1863, and received his commission the same day.

Wilmot died on March 16, 1868. He was interred in Riverside Cemetery in Towanda.

== Family ==
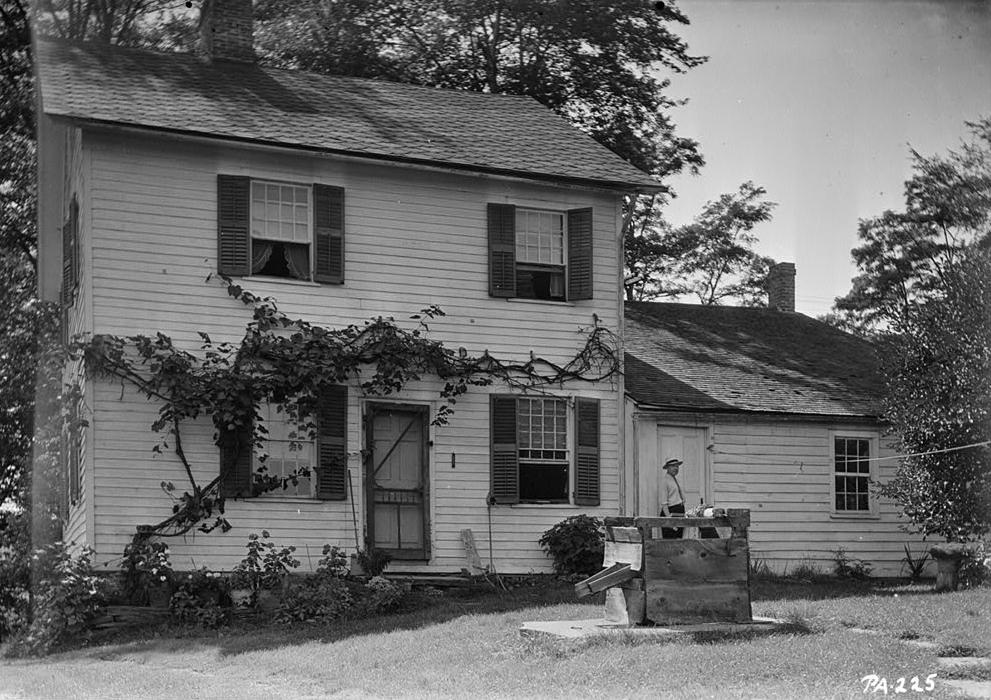
Wilmot's house in Bethany, Pennsylvania

Wilmot was the son of Randall (1792–1876) and Mary (née Grant) Wilmot (1792–1820). His father was a well-to-do merchant. In 1836, he married Anna Morgan. The couple had three children, none of whom survived childhood.

== Legacy and honors ==
- A Pennsylvania State historical marker is placed at Williams Street at the Riverside Cemetery, Towanda, identifying the cemetery as his resting place.
- The Wilmot House was added to the National Register of Historic Places in 1974, and David Wilmot School in 1988.

== Sources ==
- United States Congress. "David Wilmot (id: W000566)". Biographical Directory of the United States Congress.
- "Wilmot, David – Federal Judicial Center". Fjc.gov.
- Berwanger, Eugene H. The Frontier Against Slavery: Western Anti-Negro Prejudice and the Slavery Extension Controversy. (1967) ISBN 0-252-07056-9.
- Duff, James H. “DAVID WILMOT, THE STATESMAN AND POLITICAL LEADER.” Pennsylvania History: A Journal of Mid-Atlantic Studies 13, no. 4 (1946): 283–89. .
- Foner, Eric. Free Soil, Free Labor, Free Men: The Ideology of the Republican Party Before the Civil War. (1970) ISBN 0-19-509981-8.
- Levine, Bruce. Half Slave and Half Free: The Roots of Civil War. (1992).
- McKnight, Brian D., article on David Wilmot in Encyclopedia of the American Civil War, edited by David S. Heidler and Jeanne T. Heidler, 2000, ISBN 0-393-04758-X.
- Morrison, Michael A. Slavery and the American West: The Eclipse of Manifest Destiny and the Coming of the Civil War. (1997) ISBN 0-8078-2319-8.
- Persinger, Clark E. “The ‘Bargain of 1844’ as the Origin of the Wilmot Proviso.” The Quarterly of the Oregon Historical Society 15, no. 3 (1914): 137–46. .
- Wilentz, Sean (2005). The Rise of American Democracy: Jefferson to Lincoln. W. W. Norton & Company. ISBN 0-393-05820-4.
- Woodson, C. G. “DAVID WILMOT, A MAN OF VISION.” Negro History Bulletin 7, no. 4 (1944): 76–76. .

Party political offices
First	Republican nominee for Governor of Pennsylvania; 1857	Succeeded by Andrew Gregg Curtin
U.S. House of Representatives
Preceded by George Fuller	Member of the U.S. House of Representatives from Pennsylvania's 12th congressional district 1845–1851	Succeeded by Galusha A. Grow
U.S. Senate
Preceded by Simon Cameron	U.S. senator (Class 1) from Pennsylvania; 1861–1863; Served alongside: Edgar Cowan	Succeeded by Charles R. Buckalew
Legal offices
Preceded by Seat established by 12 Stat. 765	Judge of the Court of Claims; 1863–1868	Succeeded by Samuel Milligan
