= William Adams Richardson =

American politician (1821–1896)

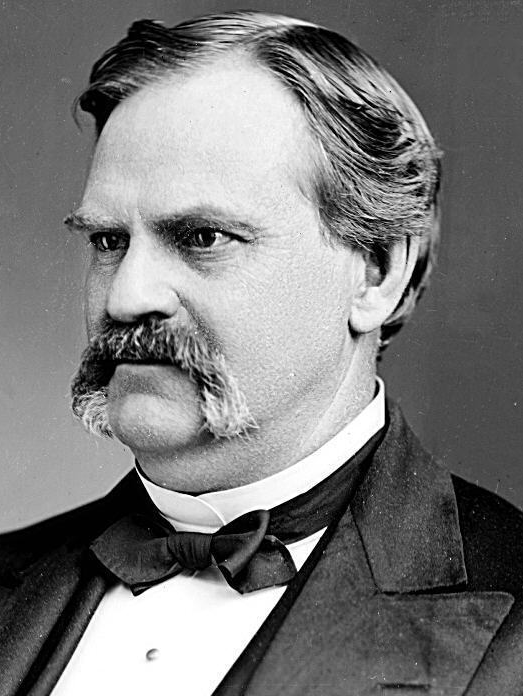

Chief Justice of the Court of Claims
- In office January 20, 1885 – October 19, 1896
- Appointed by: Chester A. Arthur
- Preceded by: Charles D. Drake
- Succeeded by: Charles C. Nott

Judge of the Court of Claims
- In office June 2, 1874 – January 20, 1885
- Appointed by: Ulysses S. Grant
- Preceded by: Samuel Milligan
- Succeeded by: John Davis

29th United States Secretary of the Treasury
- In office March 17, 1873 – June 3, 1874
- President: Ulysses S. Grant
- Preceded by: George S. Boutwell
- Succeeded by: Benjamin Bristow

Acting Attorney General
- In office 1870
- President: Andrew Johnson

Assistant Secretary of the Treasury
- In office 1869–1872
- President: Andrew Johnson

Personal details
- Born: William Adams Richardson; November 2, 1821 Tyngsborough, Massachusetts, U.S.
- Died: October 19, 1896 (aged 74) Washington, D.C., U.S.
- Resting place: Oak Hill Cemetery; Washington, D.C., U.S.
- Education: Harvard University (AB, AM, LLB)

William Adams Richardson (November 2, 1821 – October 19, 1896) was an American lawyer who served as the 29th United States secretary of the treasury from 1873 to 1874. During his tenure, the Panic of 1873 swept the nation and caused a depression that lasted five years. He controversially responded by issuing $26 million in greenbacks, which averted the crisis, although there was debate as to whether he had the authority to do so. His tenure was marred by the Sanborn incident in 1874, which involved favoritism and profiteering in the collection of unpaid taxes. He was later appointed a judge, and subsequently the chief justice, of the United States Court of Claims.

== Education and career ==
Born on November 2, 1821, in Tyngsborough, Massachusetts, Richardson studied at Pinkerton Academy and Lawrence Academy at Groton. Richardson received an Artium Baccalaureus degree in 1843, and an Artium Magister degree in 1846, both from Harvard University and a Bachelor of Laws in 1846 from Harvard Law School. He passed the Massachusetts' bar in July 1846.

Richardson entered private practice in Lowell, Massachusetts in 1846. Richardson entered partnership and practiced law with his older brother Daniel Samuel, who had a large practice in Lowell. As the junior law partner, Richardson was considered to be a painstaking methodical office attorney.

He served in the militia, first as a judge advocate with the rank of major and later as an aide to Governor George N. Briggs with the rank of lieutenant colonel. He was a Justice of the peace for Middlesex County, Massachusetts from 1847 to 1854. He was a bank President in Wamesit, Massachusetts from 1852 to 1853.

He was president of the Common Council of Lowell from 1853 to 1854, and president of the Mechanics' Association. He was appointed to revise the statutes of Massachusetts in 1855, and subsequently chosen by the legislature to edit the annual supplements of the general statutes, which he continued to do for 22 years. He was a judge of the Middlesex County Probate Court from 1856 to 1858. He was a judge of the Middlesex County Probate and Insolvency Courts from 1858 to 1872. He was an overseer of Harvard from 1863 to 1875.

== Federal executive branch service ==
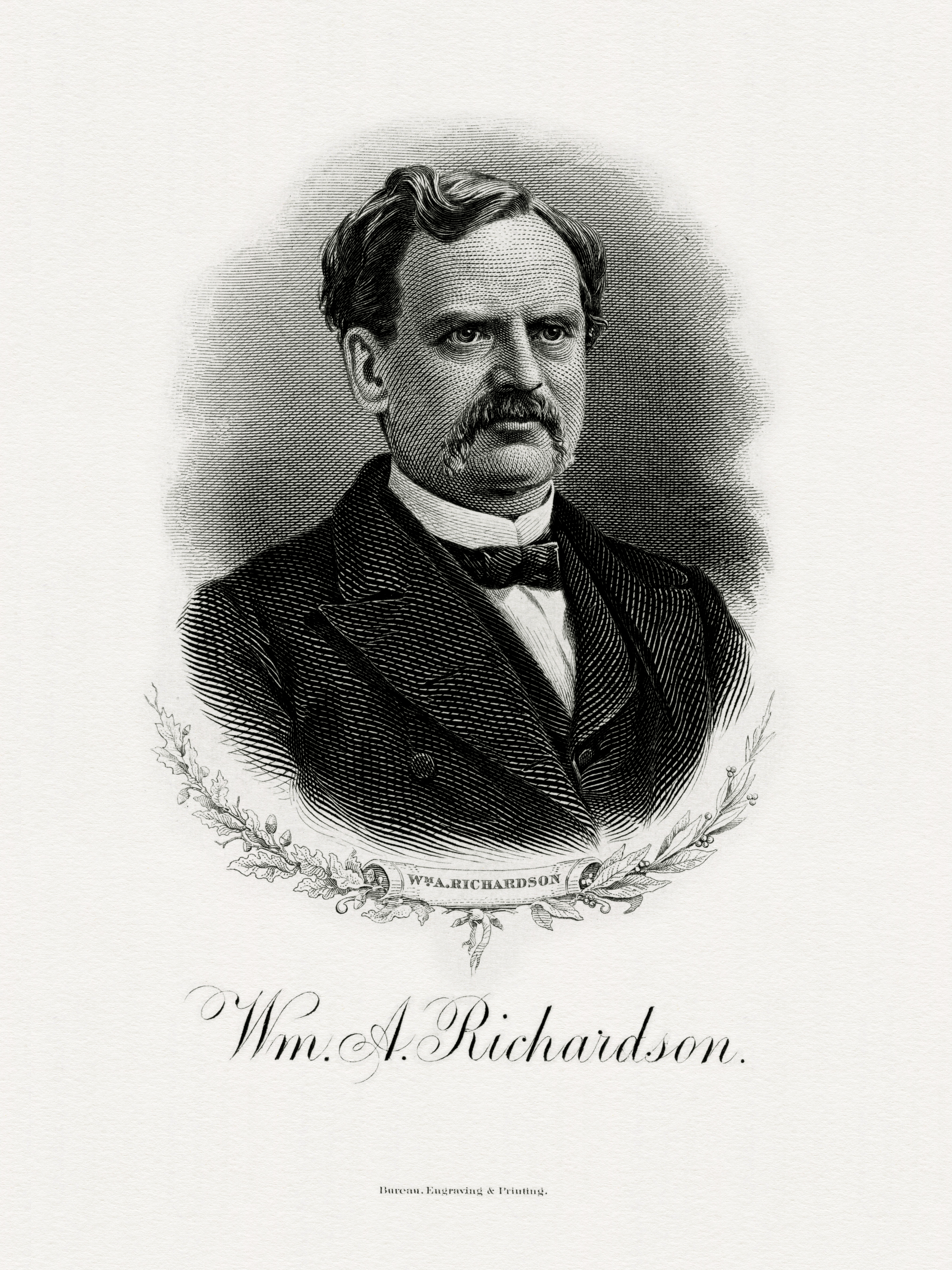
Bureau of Engraving and Printing portrait of Richardson as Secretary of the Treasury.

Richardson was a United States Assistant Secretary of the Treasury from 1869 to 1872. He was Acting Attorney General for the United States Department of Justice in 1870. He was United States Secretary of the Treasury from 1873 to 1874, under President Ulysses S. Grant.

=== Tenure as Secretary of the Treasury ===
During Richardson's tenure the Panic of 1873 swept the nation and caused a depression that lasted five years. Richardson responded by controversially releasing $26,000,000 in paper money reserves in an inflationist measure to help alleviate the effects of the general panic. There was debate whether Richardson had the authority to do so, however, Congress had not passed a law to forbid such an action. Richardson secured the $15,000,000 award from the Alabama Claims through the retirement of United States bonds held in Europe. This was to ensure that no gold had to be transferred overseas by ship.

The post-war economy had expanded so quickly that commercial banks became nervous and began calling in their loans. As a result, in the summer of 1873 the money supply tightened drastically, causing the Panic of 1873. Richardson responded by issuing $26 million in greenbacks to meet the demand. The legality of his action was doubtful, but the Congress did not interfere and the crisis was eased. Such cycles of expansion and panic continued for the next thirty years, however, and were the basis for the creation of the Federal Reserve in 1913.

Richardson's tenure was marred by the Sanborn Incident, which involved favoritism and profiteering in the collection of unpaid taxes. Pressure mounted for Richardson to be removed; he tendered his resignation, which President Grant accepted. As a face-saving gesture, Grant then appointed Richardson as a Judge of the Court of Claims.

== Federal judicial service ==
Richardson was nominated by President Ulysses S. Grant on June 1, 1874, to a Judge seat on the Court of Claims (later the United States Court of Claims) vacated by Judge Samuel Milligan. He was confirmed by the United States Senate on June 2, 1874, and received his commission the same day. His service terminated on January 20, 1885, due to his elevation to be Chief Justice of the same court.

Richardson was nominated by President Chester A. Arthur on January 15, 1885, to the Chief Justice seat on the Court of Claims vacated by Chief Justice Charles D. Drake. He was confirmed by the Senate on January 20, 1885, and received his commission the same day. His service terminated on October 19, 1896, due to his death in Washington, D.C. He was interred in Oak Hill Cemetery in Washington, D.C.

=== Other service ===
Concurrent with his federal judicial service, Richardson was the editor of the Supplement to the Revised Statutes of the United States from 1874 to 1891, as well as a professor of law at Georgetown Law from 1879 to 1894. Richardson was also a member of the District of Columbia Society of the Sons of the Revolution.

== Family ==
Richardson's father was Daniel Richardson who practiced law and was Tyngsborough's postmaster, and his mother was Mary Adams of Chelmsford. Richardson was the descendant of Ezekiel Richardson who settled in Massachusetts Bay in 1630. Richardson's mother died in 1825 and her sister became his step-mother the next year.

== Works ==
- The Banking Laws of Massachusetts (Lowell, 1855)
- Supplement to the General Statutes of the Commonwealth of Massachusetts, with George P. Sanger (Boston, 1860–1882)
- Practical information concerning the public debt of the United States: with the national banking laws (Washington, D.C., 1872)

He prepared and edited:

- Supplement to the Revised Statutes of the United States, 2nd ed. (1881)
- History, Jurisdiction, and Practice of the Court of Claims (United States) (1882–1885)

== Sources ==
- Fairman, Charles (1935). Dumas Malone (ed.). Dictionary of American Biography Richardson, William Adams. New York: Charles Scribner's Sons.
- Chernow, Ron (2017). Grant. New York: Penguin Books. pp. 776–782. ISBN 978-0143110637.

Political offices
| Preceded by George S. Boutwell | U.S. Secretary of the Treasury; Served under: Ulysses S. Grant; 1873–1874 | Succeeded by Benjamin Bristow |
Legal offices
| Preceded by Samuel Milligan | Judge of the Court of Claims; 1874–1885 | Succeeded by John Davis |
| Preceded by Charles D. Drake | Chief Justice of the Court of Claims; 1885–1896 | Succeeded by Charles C. Nott |
