= Black Friday (1869) =

American gold panic

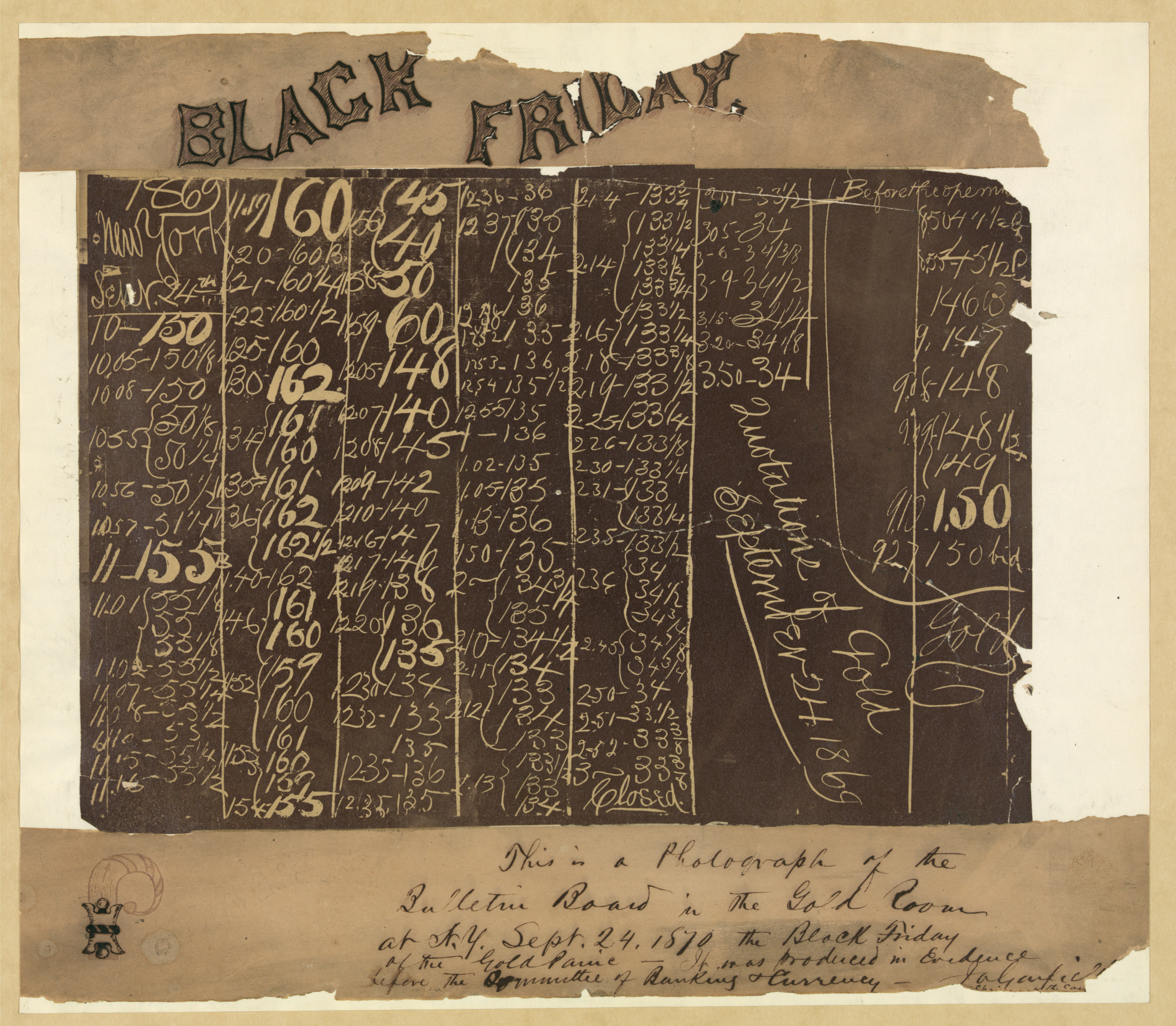
Photograph of the blackboard in the New York Gold Room, September 24, 1869, showing the collapse of the price of gold. Handwritten caption by James A. Garfield indicates it was used as evidence before the Committee of Banking & Currency during hearings in 1870.

On September 24, 1869, a gold panic broke out in the United States, triggering a financial crisis. The panic, which became known as Black Friday, was the result of a conspiracy between two investors, Jay Gould, later joined by his partner James Fisk, and Abel Corbin, a small time speculator who had married Virginia (Jennie) Grant, the younger sister of President Ulysses S. Grant. They formed the Gold Ring to corner the gold market and force up the price of the metal on the New York Gold Exchange. The scandal took place during the Grant Presidency. The Secretary of the Treasury, George S. Boutwell, had a policy to sell Treasury gold at biweekly intervals for a sinking fund to pay off the national debt. Along with other, non-routine gold sales, this infusion of cash acted to stabilize the dollar. The economy had gone through tremendous upheaval during the Civil War 1861–1865 and was not yet fully restored.

Gould, hoping to take advantage of Corbin's relationship with his brother-in-law, President Grant, persuaded Corbin to introduce him to Grant. Gould and Fisk hoped that befriending the President would get them privy information about the government's gold policy—and even prevent the sale of gold—and thereby manipulate the market. It did not work, being foiled by the government, yet resulted in a scandal that undermined both the credibility of Grant's presidency and the national economy. Gould and Fisk used their personal appearances with Grant to gain credibility on Wall Street in addition to using their insider information.

During the first week of September, Grant's Secretary of the Treasury George S. Boutwell received a letter from Grant. It told him that gold sales would be harmful to Western farmers, a notion planted by Gould and Fisk. Boutwell countermanded his own order to sell a great deal of gold, suspending non-routine Treasury gold sales for the rest of the month. At the same time, Gould, now joined by Fisk, continued buying gold through New York City's Gold Room, raising the price of gold. After learning about the nature of their scheme, Grant first told Corbin to unload his gold holdings before ordering the release of $4 million in government gold on September 24 (equivalent to $80 million in 2024). Grant's move immediately drove down the price of gold, crushing the Gold Ring's corner on the market. A panic on Wall Street ensued and the country went through months of economic turmoil, although a national depression was averted. Gould and Fisk hired the best defense available. Favored by Tweed Ring judges, the conspiratorial partners escaped prosecution. An 1870 government investigation, headed by fellow Republican James A. Garfield, exonerated Grant of any illicit involvement in the conspiracy.

== History ==
To finance the Civil War and Reconstruction, the federal government had assumed a large national debt, escalating from $64 million in 1860 to $2.8 billion by the end of the Andrew Johnson administration, when Grant was elected president in 1868 (equivalent to $2 billion and $50 billion in 2024). The problem was further compounded when the federal government issued paper money during the Civil War, known as "greenbacks", which were not redeemable in gold. Mandated as the only payment for federal debts, "both public and private", these "notes" served to take gold currency out of circulation, in accordance with Gresham's law, causing the price of gold to rise sharply. It was generally believed that the U.S. Government would eventually redeem the "greenbacks" with gold.

Grant believed that putting "sound money" back into circulation was the best approach to restoring the nation's economy. Determined to return the national economy to pre-war monetary standards, one of his first actions as president was to sign the Public Credit Act of 1869, which established a 10-year timetable for returning to the gold standard by repaying U.S. bonds in "gold or its equivalent" and redeeming greenbacks from the economy as soon as possible.

Grant had put the talented George S. Boutwell in charge of the U.S. Treasury. Boutwell's primary task was to reduce the national debt. To accomplish this, he ordered his assistant treasurer to begin selling gold from the Treasury and buying up wartime bonds in April 1869. He also initiated reforms in the Treasury Department by improving methods of tax collecting and attacking the problem of counterfeiting. By the end of May, the national debt had been reduced by $12 million (equivalent to $250 million in 2024). Boutwell's treasury policy of reducing the national debt kept the money supply level and the gold price artificially low. The goal of Grant's policy was to reduce the amount of greenbacks in circulation that could be redeemed in gold at some future date.

== Cornering the gold market ==
Black Friday's conspirators

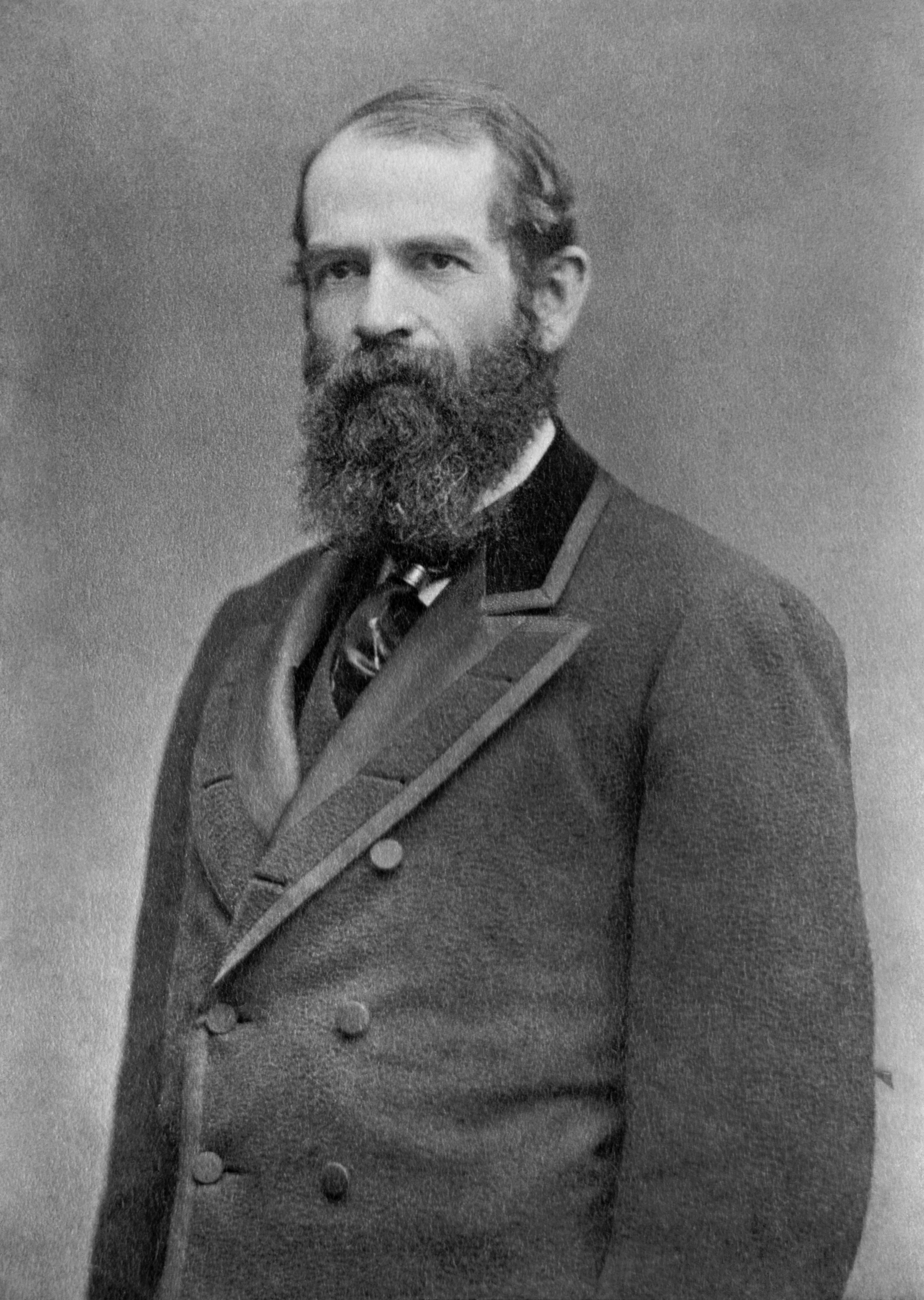
Jay Gould
Railroad developer and speculator

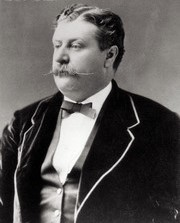
Jim Fisk
Stockbroker and speculator

In 1869, Jay Gould, a director of the Erie Railroad, sought to corner the gold market with the connivance of Abel Corbin, a financier with a shady past who was President Grant's brother-in-law. They worked to persuade the President to stop Secretary of the Treasury Boutwell from releasing weekly gold (but not affecting those routine gold sales for the sinking fund) from U.S. Treasury, with the intention of raising the gold price. James Fisk, another director who had made his fortune as a cotton smuggler during the Civil War, controlled the Erie Railroad in conjunction with Gould. He joined the conspiracy in force later on. The first step in Corbin and Gould's plan was to recruit Daniel Butterfield, a former major general and war hero during the Civil War who lacked any experience in finance. Both Corbin and Gould lobbied successfully for Butterfield's appointment as the assistant treasurer, through whom Boutwell gave orders to sell Treasury Department gold. Gould bribed Butterfield with a $10,000 check, more than Butterfield's annual salary of $8,000 (equivalent to $240,000 and $190,000 in 2025). Butterfield agreed to tip the men off when the government intended to sell gold.

Corbin was considered a smooth talker and had made money speculating in real estate. More importantly to Fisk and Gould, he had direct access to Grant. They used Corbin's relationship to get close to Grant in social situations, where they argued against government sale of gold, reinforced by Corbin. Gould also attempted to bribe Grant's personal secretary Horace Porter by giving him a $500,000 gold account in his name (equivalent to $12 million in 2025), but Porter, a former military aide to Grant, stated that he declined the offer. Not accustomed to having such offers turned down, Gould went ahead and made the purchase and opened a brokerage account in Porter's name regardless. When Porter was informed of Gould's unauthorized transaction, he refused the offer in writing. In similar fashion, Corbin approached Grant's wife Julia and attempted to entice her into accepting half interest in $250,000 in bonds (equivalent to $6 million in 2025), but she turned that offer down.

Gould secured controlling interest in the federally audited New York's Tenth National Bank, a Wall Street broker's bank that was used as a facility to contract business. In addition to meeting at Corbin's mansion, Fisk and Gould also talked with Grant on their Erie Canal railroad car and in Fisk's box seats at New York's Fifth Avenue Theatre. Gould suggested to Grant that increasing gold prices would lower the dollar and allow farmers in the West to sell their crops overseas, but Grant gave no response. Both Grant and Boutwell strongly felt that the nation's wartime debt had to be paid to assure the credibility of the United States in the eyes of the European banks. To accomplish this, Boutwell began selling gold from the Treasury's reserve of $100 million in gold bars (equivalent to $2.1 billion in 2024), initially without the President's express consent, and using the proceeds to buy back U.S. bonds. Boutwell's controversial approach was later endorsed by Grant, giving Boutwell all the latitude he needed. Boutwell later wrote that only outsiders unaware of the finer designs of his dealings thought "the President was taking any part in the operations of the treasury concerning the price of gold". Grant, meanwhile, was unaware that his appearances in the company of Gould and Fisk sent a message to Wall Street that he supported raising the gold price.

When buying gold and bonds, Boutwell placed all his orders through Daniel Butterfield in New York. To reduce the temptation of illicit dealing, Boutwell, at Butterfield's recommendation, publicly announced his orders by telegraphing the news to the Associated Press. Over the next few months Treasury gold began to flood the market while Boutwell began buying back wartime bonds. By September 1, Boutwell had reduced the national debt by $50 million (equivalent to $1 billion in 2024). He continued this practice at an accelerated rate while Grant, having closely followed Boutwell's dealings, began to express reservations and sent him a letter from Washington, Pennsylvania, criticizing that driving the price of gold down would hurt farmers. Many brokerage firms collapsed while trade volume and agriculture prices plummeted, causing a mild recession, but by January 1870, the economy resumed its post-war recovery. Boutwell saw little merit in either Grant's or Gould's arguments, feeling that the government had no place in manipulating the market regardless of who benefited. However, not wanting to go against the President, Boutwell ordered Butterfield to halt semi-weekly September government gold sales. Believing he now had a "green light" from Grant, Gould began buying gold through brokers at an accelerated rate, increasing his gold stake from $10 to $18 million in specie (equivalent to $210 million to $380 million in 2024).

== Breaking the Gold Ring ==
Broke the Gold Ring corner

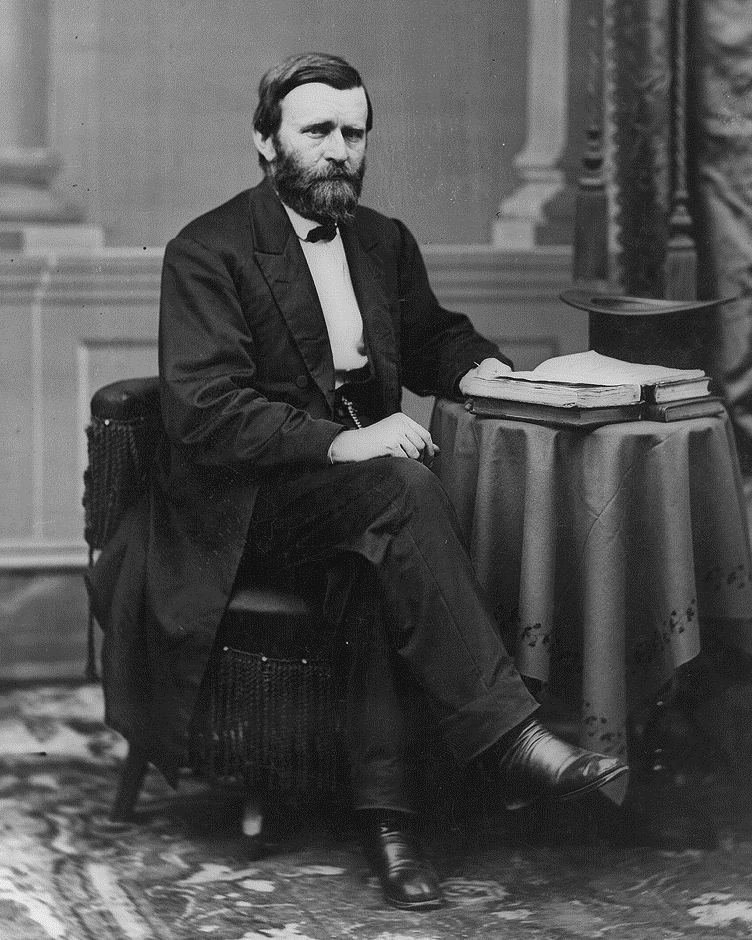
Ulysses S. Grant
President of the United States

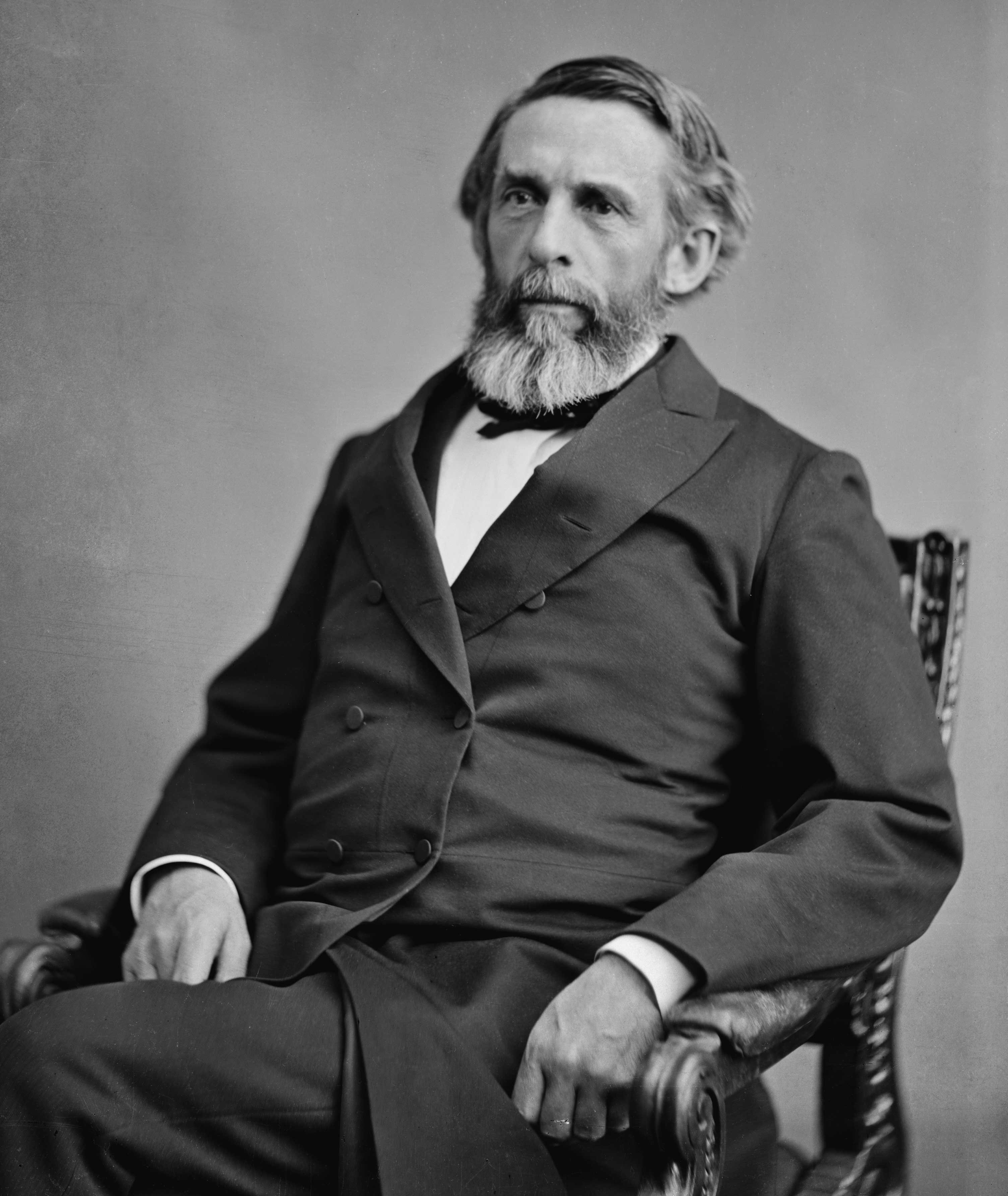
George S. Boutwell
Secretary of the Treasury

Starting on September 1, 1869, Gould and Fisk put their plot into motion by purchasing $1.5 million in gold in the names of Corbin and Butterfield (equivalent to $30 million in 2024). The conspirators would make $15,000 (equivalent to $360,000 in 2025) for every dollar rise in the price of gold (which was quoted in increments of $100 face value of gold coin, each containing 4.8375 troy ounces). By September 6, the gold quote had risen from $132.50 to $137. By September 7, Gould was faced with a startling reversal when members of his group were directed to sell off the $6 million ($130 million in 2024) they had achieved during the previous buying frenzy of April 1869. Prices of gold fell sharply from $137 to $134 in one day. Gould lost more than $100,000 in two days (equivalent to $2.4 million in 2025).

Abandoned by his associates, Gould looked to Fisk for assistance, but he was away on railroad business. Fisk returned to New York on September 8 and found Gould worried and depressed. Fisk reminded Gould that he still had "enough gold to sink a ship" while the two looked to others and devised other schemes to come out on top, but they knew by this time that if they began buying again, the Treasury would counter their efforts and begin selling at an accelerated rate once again.

Gould and Fisk had a list of every broker and speculator who had borrowed gold from the gold exchange, some 250 in all, including Jay Cooke, the biggest financier on Wall Street and a prominent voice urging Grant to step in and break the Gold Ring. Fisk proposed that the list be published in the newspapers the next day with the demand that the "bulls and bears" settle on their debts by three o'clock, at a fixed rate of $160. If they refused, Fisk was ready to squeeze them at an even higher rate, a scheme that bordered on blackmail. Fisk's associates scoffed at the scheme and criticized Fisk of being true to form for suggesting such an unconventional idea. After being warned that the idea violated New York State criminal conspiracy law, Gould, Fisk and their associates chose another approach: On Friday, they drove the price of gold to an even higher price by buying large amounts of gold at the current high price and selling even higher, regardless of the political and economic effects. Fisk, however, saw the flaw to this alternative approach, fearing that pushing the price of gold up too quickly would provoke the President to step in and break the gold corner.

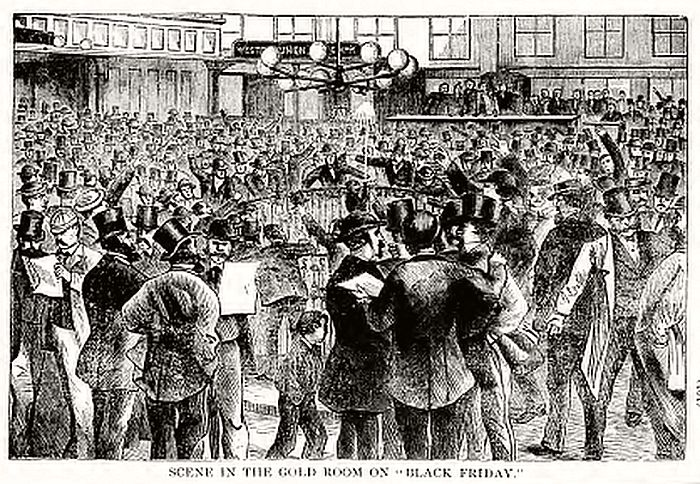
Panic in Gold room on Black Friday

On September 12, Grant warned Boutwell that a "desperate struggle" was taking place between the "bulls and bears" of the gold market and that Boutwell should continue the current policy, which was to suspend the sales of gold. Corbin told Gould he was concerned that Grant would start selling gold from the Treasury, so Gould told Corbin to write a letter to Grant encouraging him not to sell. Corbin wrote Grant the letter, now lost, encouraging Grant not to sell gold. Fisk had the letter delivered by William Chapin of the Erie Railroad, to Washington, Pennsylvania, where Grant was vacationing with his wife's cousin. Interrupting Grant's croquet game, Chapin gave him Corbin's letter, whereupon Grant read the letter and told Chapin that it was satisfactory, but said, "No, nothing" when Chapin asked for a reply. When Chapin had left, Porter told Grant about Gould setting up a $500,000 gold account in Porter's name. Upon hearing this, Grant finally realized what Gould and Fisk were up to. Through a letter his wife was writing to his sister, Grant urged Corbin to have nothing to do with Gould and Fisk and get out of the speculation, and Grant promptly arranged a meeting with Boutwell. On September 20, 1869, Gould and Fisk started hoarding gold, driving the price higher. Gold closed at $141 on September 22, at which time Fisk and Gould owned between $50 and $60 million in gold between the two of them (equivalent to about $1.1 billion in 2024), about three times the public supply available in New York. The increase in gold prices on this day alone had netted a profit of $1.75 million for the two conspirators (equivalent to $42 million in 2025). On Thursday, September 23, Gould visited Corbin's house and was informed of Julia's letter, which had arrived that day. After reading it and discovering that Grant was annoyed with Corbin's speculations, Gould knew that Grant was likely to sell government gold on Friday. Subsequently, Corbin asked Gould if he would buy Corbin's account so he could tell Grant that he no longer owned any gold, but Gould refused to bail Corbin out, fearing it would trigger a collapse in the market. Instead, he offered Corbin $100,000 interest (equivalent to $2.4 million in 2025) and exclaimed, "Mr. Corbin, I am undone if that letter gets out". Gould chose not to inform Fisk of this recent development. When Grant returned to Washington D.C., he found $60,000 worth of gifts from the Gold Ring sent to the White House (equivalent to $1.5 million in 2025). Sensing bribery, Grant immediately ordered the paintings and statues boxed up and returned.

On September 23, Grant and Boutwell met and the two decided to break the Gold Ring by selling gold from the treasury if the gold price continued to rise. On September 24, Gould began quietly selling his gold while Gold Room agents put up a public front and continued buying at a lesser rate with Fisk leading the spurious buying activity. When gold had surpassed $155 on Friday, September 24, Grant ordered Boutwell to release $4 million in gold (equivalent to $80 million in 2024) and buy $4 million worth of bonds. Within minutes, the price of gold dropped from $160 to $138 and Gould's and Fisk's gold corner was broken. Some speculators were ruined, while gamblers who had bet that the gold price would go down made money. Corbin lost money on the loan he had taken to buy gold.

== Aftermath and investigation ==
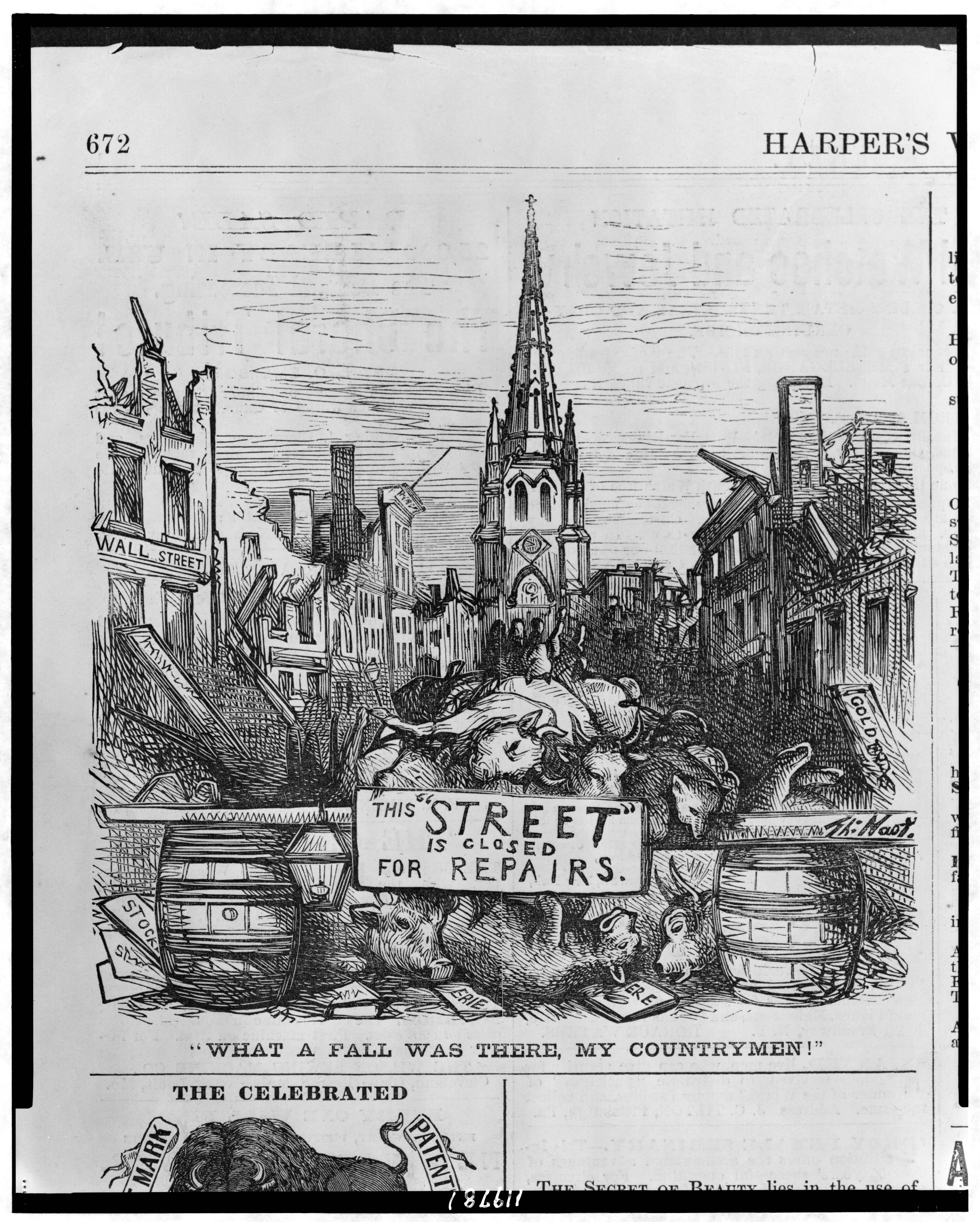
Political cartoon depicting the impact of the panic on Wall Street

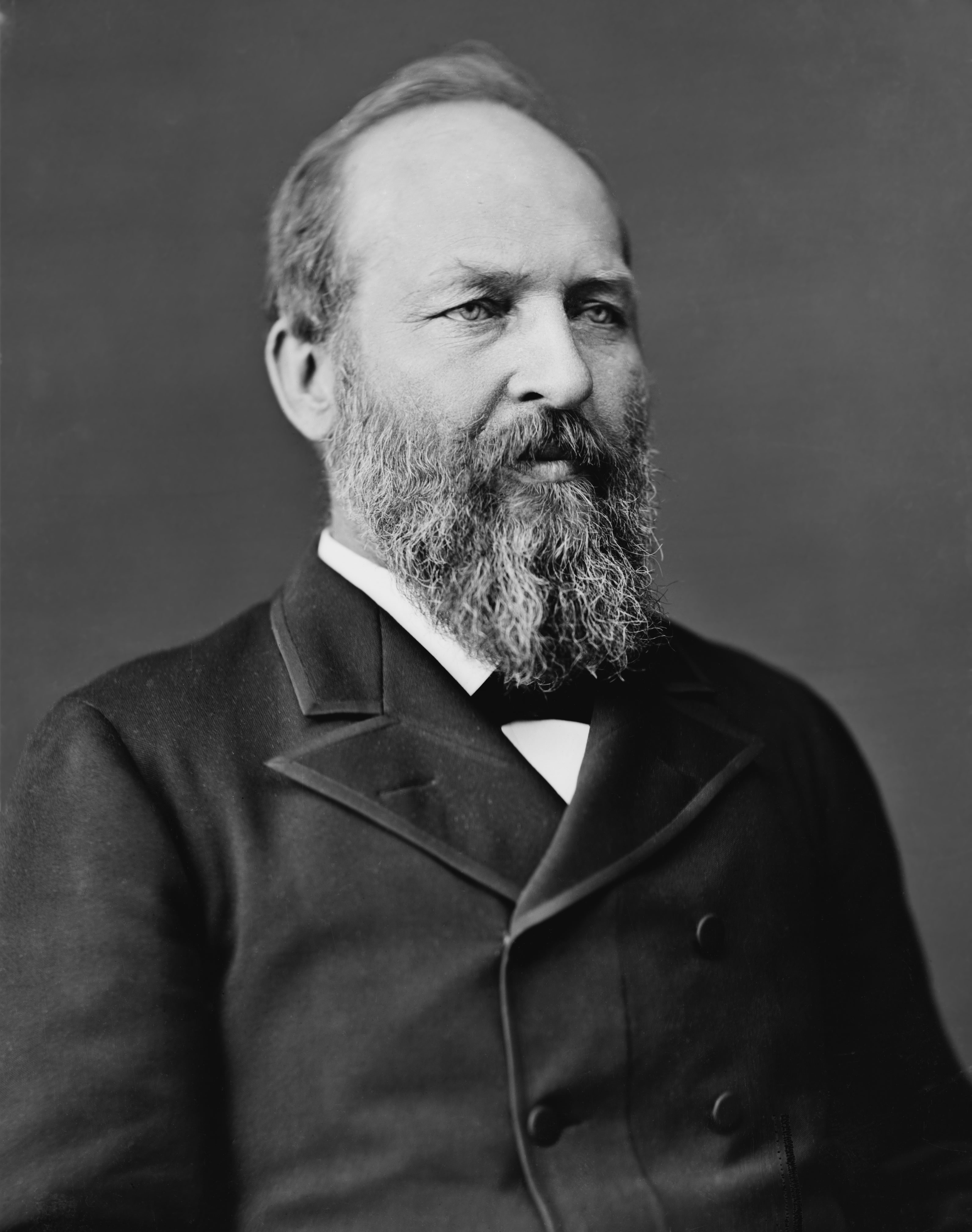
James A. Garfield Chairman of the House Banking Committee

The Black Friday September 24 gold crash caused the United States financial devastation for months. On Saturday, September 25, Gould, Fisk and Corbin met at Gould's office at the Opera House, each claiming to be the victim and blaming the other for the disaster. Obligated to make good on all debts, the Gold Exchange Bank no longer had enough reserves to cover the mounting debts, while the situation there deteriorated by the hour. The Tenth National Bank, which normally closed at 3:00 pm on that day, had depositors and speculators crowding the sidewalk at its front door. The police set up patrols inside and outside the bank.

Stock prices dropped by 20 percent from September 24 to October 1, while trade was minimal. Between January 1870 and September 1870, only 4 million shares of stock were exchanged. Dozens of brokerage firms went bankrupt, those who bought paper gold from Fisk's gold room going unpaid. Farmers, who constituted 50 percent of the country's workforce, suffered the worst: wheat prices on the Chicago trade fell from $1.40 to $0.77 a bushel (equivalent to $36 to $20 in 2025), corn dropped from $0.95 to $0.68 (equivalent to $24 to $17 in 2025), and other commodities such as rye, oats, and barley had similar losses. The New York Tribune reported that goods ready for export could not be shipped. Grant's and Boutwell's actions to break the Gold Ring, however, kept the Wall Street panic from growing into a national depression. Butterfield was allowed to resign from the U.S. Treasury without an investigation in October, 1869.

The subsequent Congressional investigation was chaired by Republican James A. Garfield. Grant's decision to counter the escalating price of gold did not completely dispel rumors that he and his administration had profited from the affair. It has been alleged on the one hand that the investigation had been limited because Virginia Corbin and First Lady Julia Grant were not called to testify at President Grant's behest. Julia Grant may even have received $25,000 in profits from the speculation (equivalent to $600,000 in 2025). The committee's Republican majority rejected the proffered testimony from a D.C. businessman who reported seeing the $25,000 entry in an Adams Express Company ledger. When forced to confront the entry in the ledger, however, even the Adams Express executive who brought the ledger in admitted that his first impression was that the figures in the entry for Mrs. U. S. Grant were $25,000. The committee's Republicans put forth the excuse this was really a $250.00 entry and denied "the groundless and wicked charge, that Mrs. Grant was interested in this speculation". Garfield's biographer, Alan Peskin maintains that the investigation was quite thorough. The investigation cleared Grant of wrongdoing, but excoriated Gould for his manipulation of the gold market and Corbin for exploiting his personal connections to Grant. Butterfield was implicated for serving as a double agent giving information to Gould. In his Congressional testimony, Gould said Grant "was a very pure, high-minded man; that if he was satisfied what was the best thing to do, that was what he would do".

Dodging any financial harm, Fisk and Gould escaped conviction, spending money to buy the best legal defense, including talented attorney David Dudley Field, while Democratic Tweed Ring judges such as Albert Cardozo shielded them in court. Gould remained a force on Wall Street, and when he died in December 1892, his estate was worth $70 million (equivalent to $2.2 billion in 2024). Fisk remained wealthy, but was caught in a scandalous love triangle and shot to death on January 6, 1872. Boutwell served the remainder of Grant's first term, and resigned in 1873 to run for United States senator from Massachusetts, serving until 1877 before retiring to private life. In 1871, the Tweed Ring run by "Boss" Tweed was broken by New York reformers including Edwards Pierrepont, Grant's future Attorney General, and prominent member of the Committee of Seventy.

Henry Adams believed that President Ulysses S. Grant was much too tolerant of his corrupt associates. In 1870, Adams wrote an article, "The New York Gold Conspiracy", that detailed Gould and Fisk's scheme to corner the gold market, and hinted that Grant had participated in or at least known of the scheme.

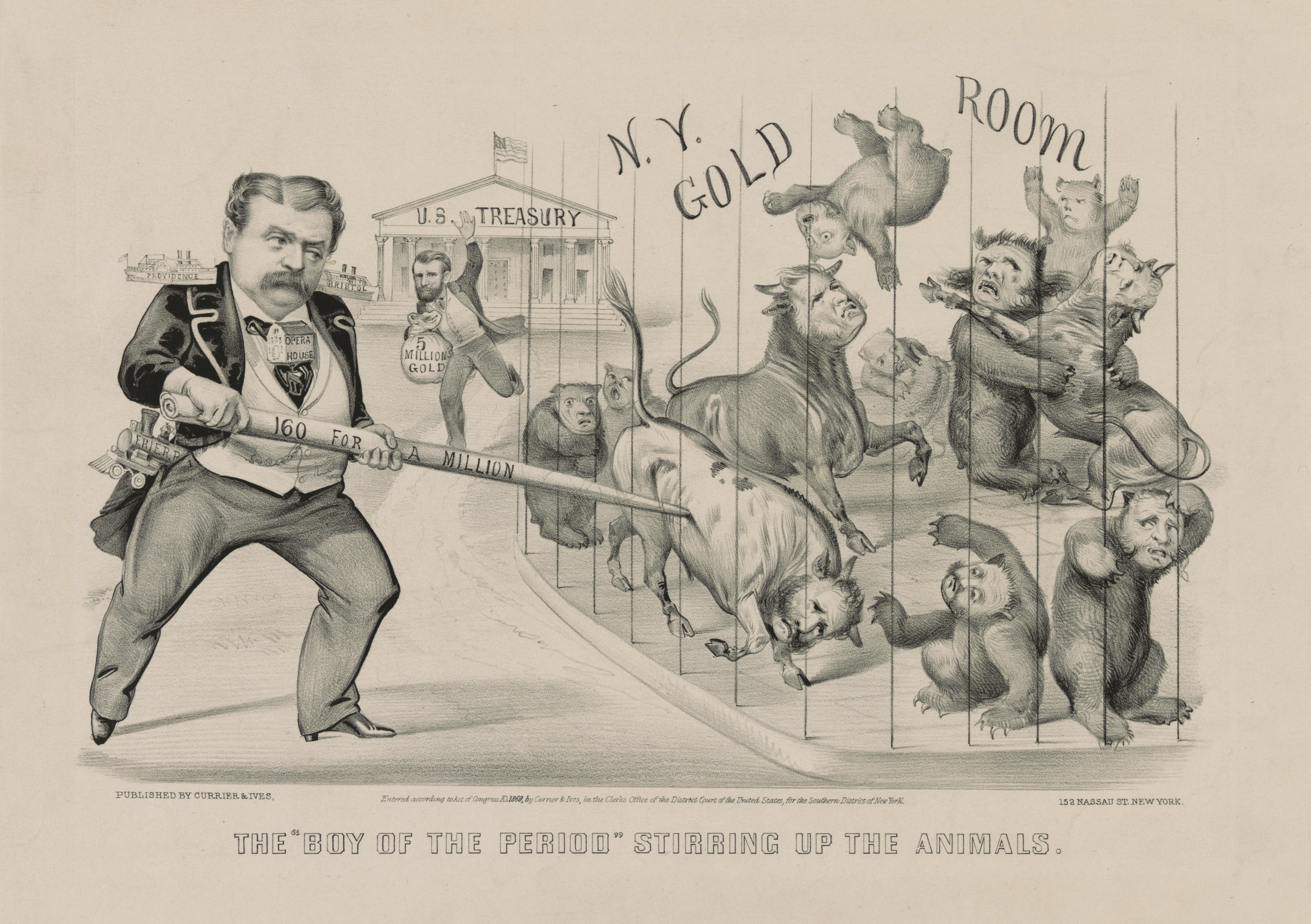
A cartoon showing Jim Fisk stirring up the gold market in New York. Grant is shown running holding a bag of gold.

== See also ==
- Bibliography of Ulysses S. Grant
- Ulysses S. Grant presidential administration scandals
- Panic of 1857
- Panic of 1893
- Silver Thursday
- Stock market crashes
- The Toast of New York – 1937 film of fictionalized story of Fisk's life, with dramatic presentation of the gold corner.
