= Tenth National Bank =

19th-century New York bank

The Tenth National Bank was an American bank that existed in the 19th century. At one time, financier Jay Gould acquired a controlling interest in the bank, and New York's William M. Tweed ("Boss Tweed") was one of its directors. The Tenth National Bank was also "Gould's primary vehicle to finance his move to establish a gold corner," leading up to Black Friday (1869).

The bank failed in the 1870s.
