= Abel Corbin =

American newspaper editor and financier (1808–1881)

Abel Rathbone Corbin
- Born: May 24, 1808; Otsego County, New York, US
- Died: March 28, 1881 (aged 72); Jersey City, New Jersey, US
- Occupations: Newspaper editor, financier
- Spouses: Elizabeth McAllister (1st Wife), Virginia Grant (2nd Wife)

Abel Rathbone Corbin (May 24, 1808 – March 28, 1881) was an American newspaper editor, financier, and the husband of Virginia Grant, sister of President Ulysses S. Grant. In the 1830s, he edited the Missouri Argus of St. Louis, the official Democratic party organ of Missouri. He was involved in the Black Friday stock market crash of September 24, 1869.

Corbin was born in Otsego County, New York to Eliakim Lyon Corbin and Lodama (née Rathbone) Corbin. He married on May 13, 1869, in Covington, Kentucky, to Virginia Grant as his second wife. They had one child, Jennie Corbin, who died as an infant. Abel's first marriage, to Elizabeth (née Lewis) McAllister (1794–1868), also had no surviving issue. Abel Corbin died in Jersey City, New Jersey.
