= Frederick Dent Grant =

United States Army general and son of Ulysses S. Grant (1850–1912)

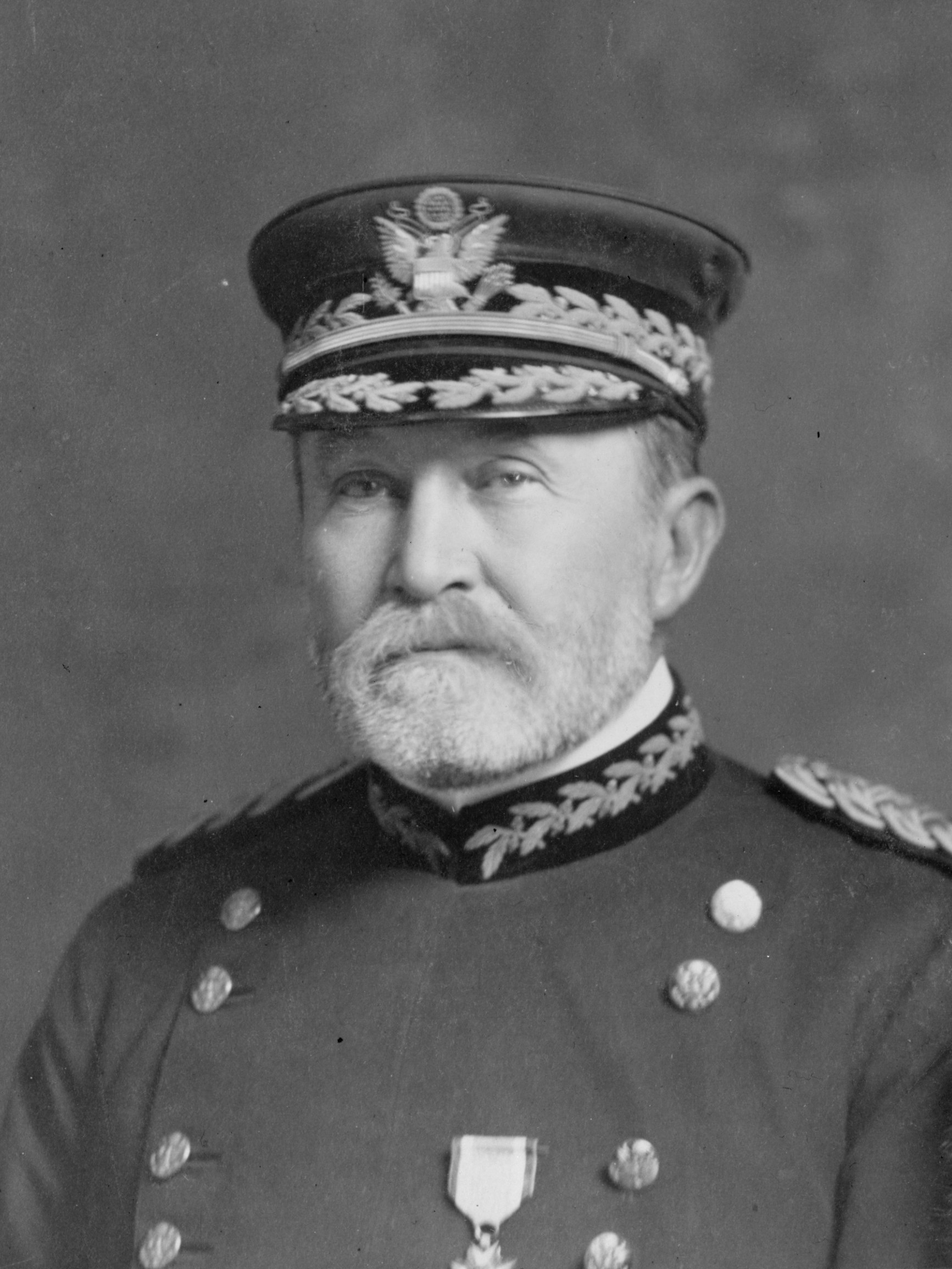
- Grant in 1905

15th United States Minister to Austria-Hungary
- In office May 15, 1889 – June 8, 1893
- Monarch: Franz Joseph I
- President: Benjamin Harrison; Grover Cleveland
- Preceded by: Alexander R. Lawton
- Succeeded by: Bartlett Tripp

Personal details
- Born: May 30, 1850 St. Louis, Missouri, U.S.
- Died: April 12, 1912 (aged 61) Governors Island, New York, U.S.
- Resting place: West Point Cemetery
- Spouse: Ida Marie Honoré (m. 1874)
- Relations: Frederick Tracy Dent (uncle); Ulysses S. Grant Jr. (brother); Ellen Wrenshall Grant (sister); Jesse Root Grant II (brother); Ulysses S. Grant IV (nephew); Chapman Grant (nephew)
- Children: Julia; Ulysses III
- Parent(s): Ulysses S. Grant; Julia Grant
- Education: United States Military Academy
- Occupation: Civil engineer, businessman, police commissioner
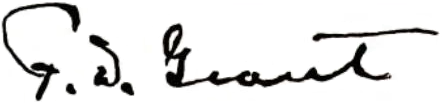
- Signature

Military service
- Allegiance: United States
- Branch/service: United States Army
- Years of service: 1871–1881, 1898–1912
- Rank: Major General
- Unit: 4th Cavalry Regiment
- Commands: 14th New York Volunteers; Department of the East
- Battles/wars: Indian Wars: Bannock War; Spanish–American War; Philippine–American War

Frederick Dent Grant (May 30, 1850 – April 12, 1912) was a soldier and United States minister to Austria-Hungary. Grant was the first son of General and President of the United States Ulysses S. Grant and Julia Grant. He was named after his maternal uncle, Frederick Tracy Dent.

== Early life ==
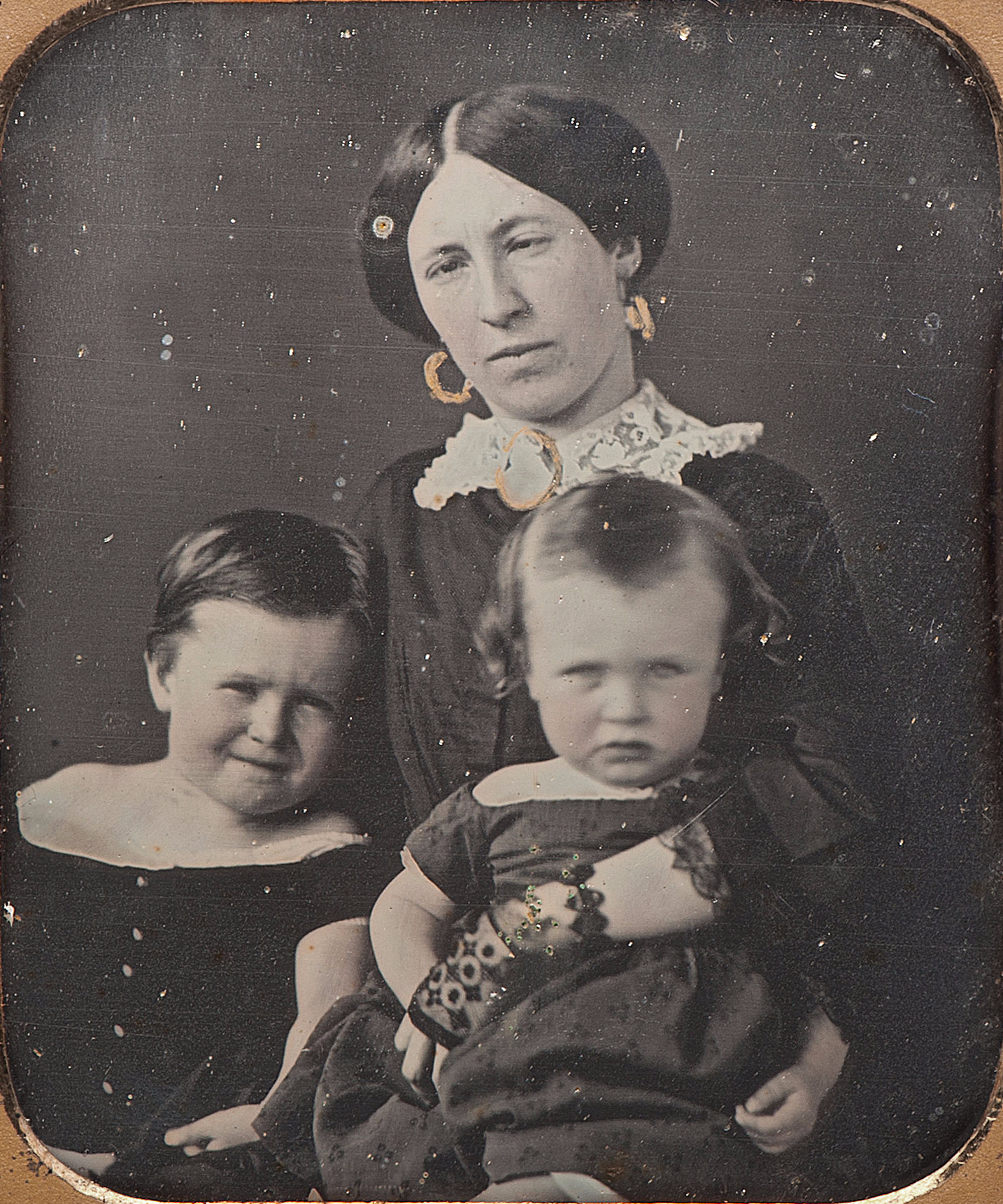
Grant with his mother Julia and brother Ulysses Jr., 1854

His father was in the United States Army when Frederick was born in St. Louis, Missouri. The family moved as the senior Grant was assigned to posts in Michigan and New York. Frederick spent his early childhood at his paternal grandparents' house while his father was stationed on the West Coast. After his father's resignation from the army, the family lived in St. Louis and in Galena, Illinois.

Frederick attended public school in Galena until the outbreak of the American Civil War in 1861. Grant's father organized a volunteer regiment and was made a colonel. Frederick joined his father when the regiment was sent to northern Missouri, but he was sent home when it arrived. Later, he rejoined his father & the regiment, accompanying them on and off for several campaigns throughout the war. Eager to be a part of the action, Frederick put himself in harm's way many times while with his father. While following retreating Confederate soldiers in the aftermath of the Battle of Big Black River Bridge, he was shot in the leg by a sharpshooter. Despite the painful infection, doctors were able to save his leg. In his weakened state, Frederick fell victim to typhoid fever, which was common in Union camps during the war, but made a full recovery.

== West Point controversy ==
Grant was appointed to West Point in 1866, and graduated in 1871.

On June 1, 1870, the first African American cadet, James Webster Smith, from South Carolina, was admitted into the United States Military Academy. Smith was sponsored by Senator Adelbert Ames of Mississippi, and nominated by Representative Solomon L. Hoge of South Carolina. Smith was handpicked for his outstanding character and scholarly ability by David Clark, a northern philanthropist. While at West Point, Smith was forced to endure intense racism and violence, and was shunned by other West Point attendees. Grant would later be accused of involvement in the harassment which Smith endured.

While Grant was named as one of the chief persecutors of Smith by American historian William McFeely in his 1981 biography of Ulysses S. Grant, where he is quoted as saying to his father, then President, that "no damned nigger will ever graduate from West Point," recent scholarship has raised questions about McFeely's sources. The evidence McFeely employed to assert Grant's racism comes from an entirely separate hazing incident in 1870 involving a number of white cadets that Smith was never involved with. In a January 1871 investigation of the hazing, Grant testified to the Committee on Military Affairs that he was aware of the prank, that he supported it, and that he did nothing to stop it. McFeely conflates Grant's testimony from this case with the separate court martial cases against Smith to make it look like he was aware of and supported Smith's harassment. In actuality, Grant never testified in Smith's cases, nor did he admit to playing any role in his harassment. In addition, the inflammatory racism cited by McFeely was described by a witness who was not present at the meeting.

Smith was later discharged after failing an unconventional private examination by Professor Peter Michie. While Grant denied being a leader of the cadets who hazed Smith for being an African American, McFeely stated that there is "considerable evidence" to suggest that he actively participated, and that "Frederick [...] "used his peculiar authority" in support of "the ceaseless harassment" of Smith". However, according to Brooks D. Simpson, "McFreely does not reveal the nature of this "considerable evidence"", while the only "document cited in support of this contention, a letter from Smith to [...] David Clark [...] does not mention Fred Grant, nor does McFeely mention any instance when Smith named the president's son as one of his tormentors."

Smith died of tuberculosis in 1876, and was eventually granted a posthumous commission in the United States Army in 1997.

== Early military career ==
Upon graduating from West Point, Grant was assigned to the 4th U.S. Cavalry Regiment. He took a leave of absence to work with the Union Pacific Railroad as a civil engineer. Late in 1871, he was aide-de-camp to General William Tecumseh Sherman in Europe. He rejoined the 4th Cavalry in Texas in 1872.

In 1873, he was assigned to the staff of General Philip Sheridan and promoted to lieutenant colonel. He was on a Yellowstone Expedition and was with George Armstrong Custer during the Black Hills expedition.

His daughter Julia was born on June 6, 1876. Grant received leave to travel to Washington, D.C. for her birth.

In 1877, he took a leave of absence to accompany his father and mother on a trip around the world.

In 1878, Grant was in the Bannock War and was in the fight against Victorio in New Mexico.

== Civilian career ==
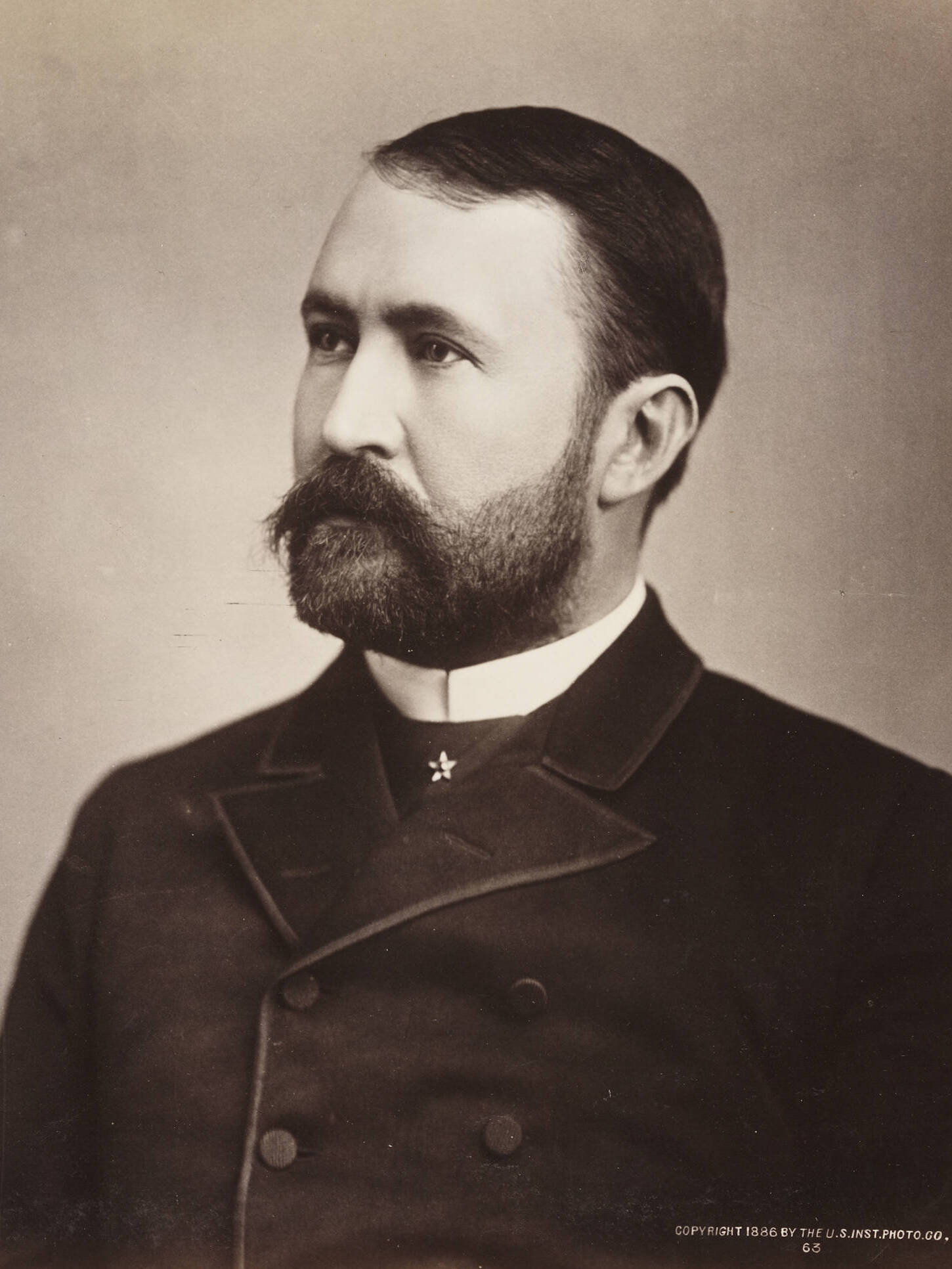
Grant c. 1886

Frederick Grant resigned from the U.S. Army in 1881, and assisted his father in preparing the latter's memoirs. During this time, he was in business in New York City.

In 1887, he ran on the Republican ticket for Secretary of State of New York, but was defeated by the Democratic incumbent Frederick Cook. In 1889, President Benjamin Harrison appointed him the U.S. Minister to Austria-Hungary. After Grover Cleveland became president in March 1893, Grant continued in his post until his successor presented his credentials on June 8, 1893.

Grant became a commissioner of police in New York City in 1894, an office he held until 1898. He served on the Police Commission along with future President Theodore Roosevelt.

== Spanish–American War and later military career ==
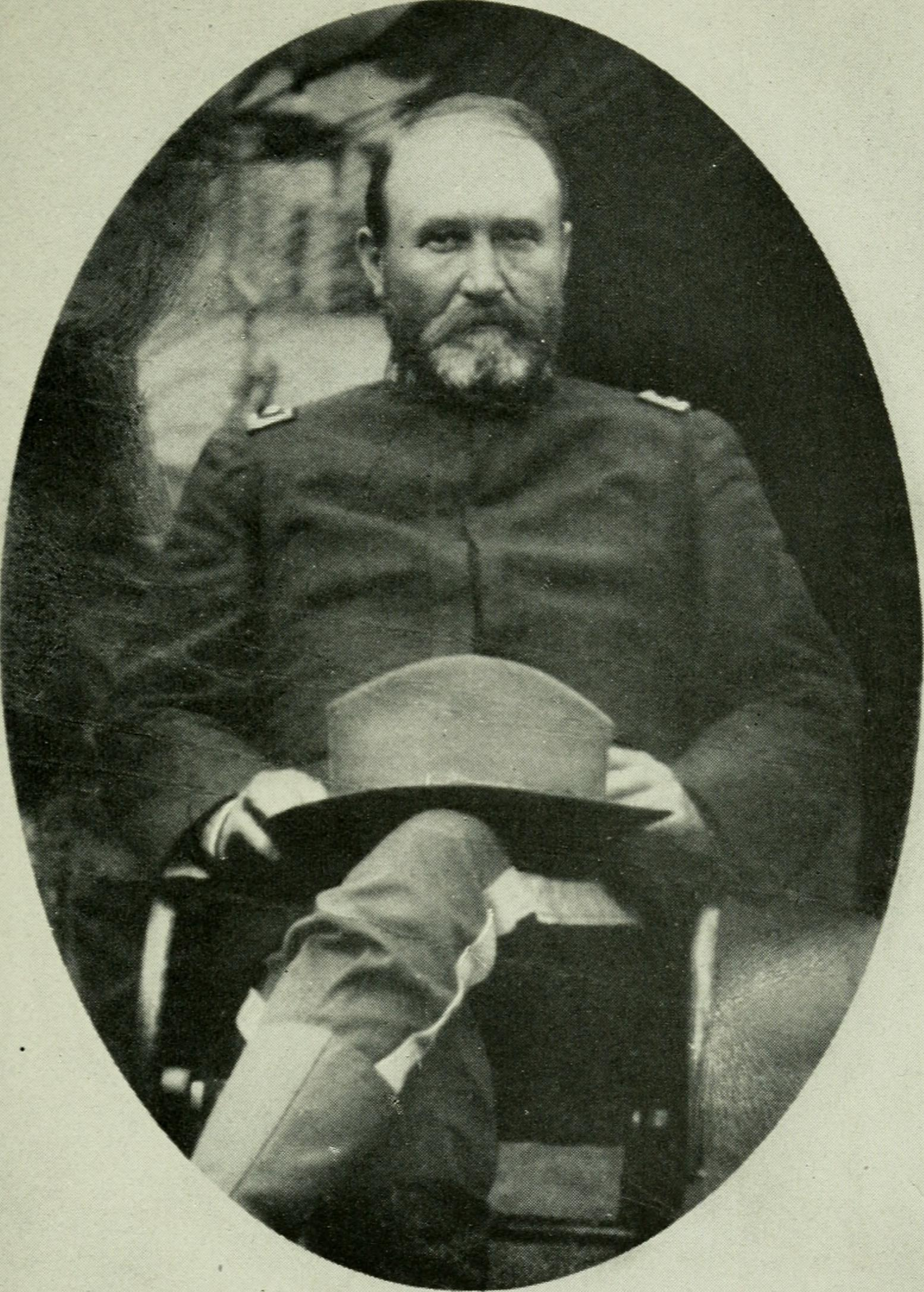
Grant during the Spanish–American War, 1898

When the Spanish–American War started in 1898, Grant was commissioned as colonel of the 14th New York Volunteers on May 2, 1898, and was promoted to brigadier general of volunteers on the 27th of the same month. He arrived in Ponce, Puerto Rico on August 16 and participated in the occupation of Puerto Rico under General Nelson Miles.

In 1899, Grant was sent to the Philippines for service in the Philippine–American War. He arrived in Manila on June 19 and was given command of 2d Brigade, 1st Division, 8th Corps (southern line) on July 1. On February 18, 1901, he was commissioned a brigadier general in the Regular Army. He remained in the Philippines until October 1902.

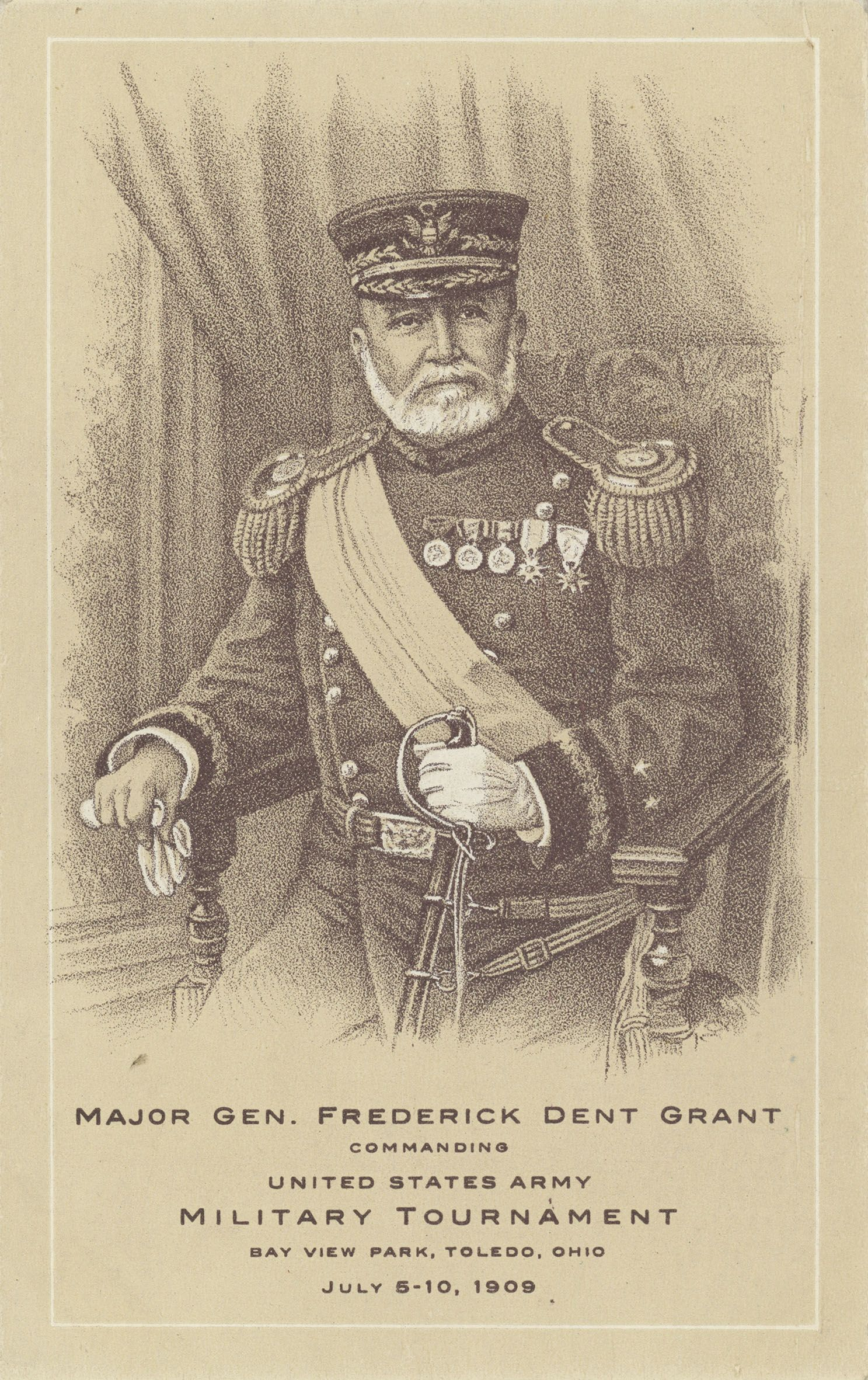
Frederick Dent Grant at a Military Tournament, Toledo, Ohio, 1909

When he returned to the United States, he held various commands and was promoted to major general in February 1906. In May 1906 he asked that YMCAs be established at every post under his command because the associations reduced "courts-martial and desertions, and the enlisted men were more contented and happy. ... the service ... was invaluable to the army."

On July 25, 1910, he was made commander of the Department of the East. On July 11, 1911, he became commander for the Eastern Division which included the Department of the East and the Department of the Gulf.

== Death ==
Frederick Dent Grant died of cancer, the same disease that had claimed his father, and diabetes in the Hotel Buckingham near Fort Jay on Governors Island in New York City on April 12, 1912. At the time of his death, Grant was the second most senior officer on active duty in the U.S. Army after Major General Leonard Wood. His funeral service was held in the chapel at Fort Jay and he was buried in the West Point Cemetery.

== Memberships ==
Grant was a hereditary companion of the Military Order of the Loyal Legion of the United States by right of his father's service in the Civil War. He joined the Military Order of Foreign Wars as a Hereditary Companion in 1896 (of which he also became a Veteran Companion after the Spanish–American War in 1898). He was also a member of the Aztec Club of 1847, the Sons of the American Revolution, the Society of Colonial Wars, the Order of the Founders and Patriots of America and the Military Order of the Carabao. He served as the first Governor General of the Order of the Founders and Patriots of America from 1896 to 1898 and again as its ninth Governor General from 1910 to 1912.

== Personal life ==
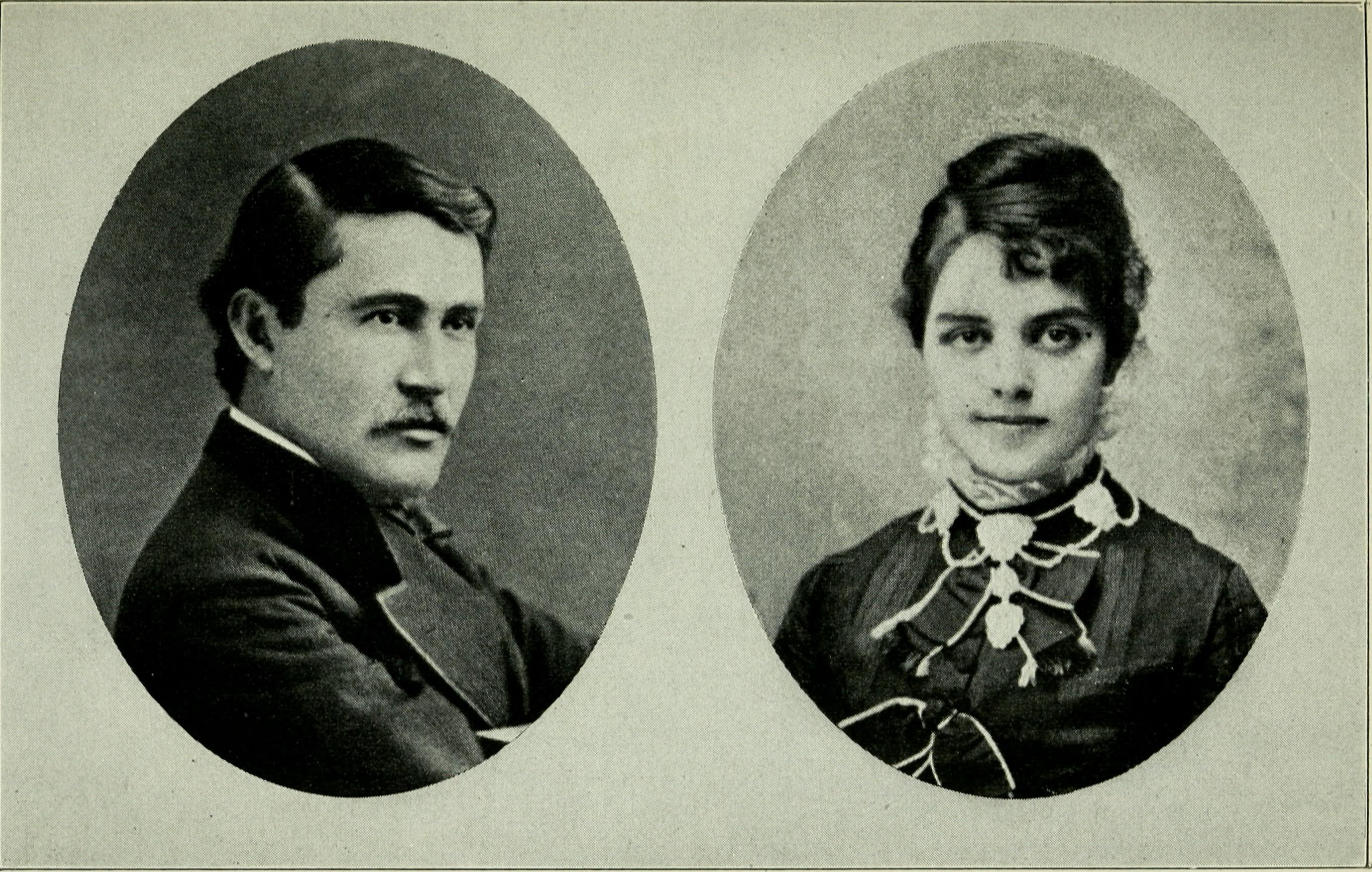
Grant and his wife Ida c. 1874

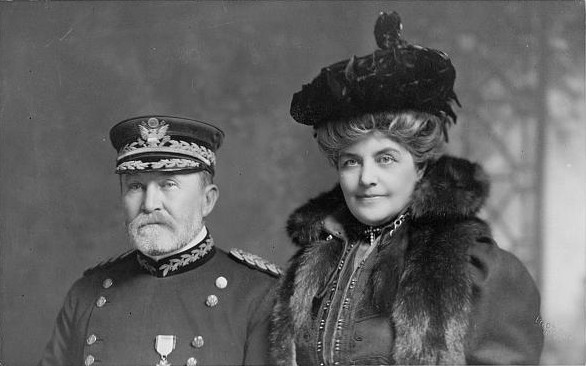
Grant and his wife Ida in 1905

In 1874, Grant married Ida Marie Honoré (1854–1930), the daughter of Henry Hamilton Honoré, who made his fortune in Chicago real estate. Ida Marie's sister was Bertha Palmer, the wife of Chicago businessman Potter Palmer. They were married in Chicago and had two children:

- Julia Dent Grant (1876–1975), who married Prince Mikhail Cantacuzène, a Russian general and diplomat, in 1899.
- Ulysses S. Grant III (1881–1968), who married Edith Root (1878–1962), the daughter of Elihu Root, the U.S. Secretary of State, under President Theodore Roosevelt and U.S. Secretary of War, under presidents William McKinley and Theodore Roosevelt, in 1907. He graduated from West Point in 1903 and served in both World Wars. He retired in 1946 as a major general.

=== Descendants ===
Through his daughter, Grant was the grandfather of Prince Michael Mikhailovich Cantacuzène, Princess Bertha Mikhailovna, and Princess Zenaida Mikhailovna, who married Sir John Coldbrook Hanbury-Williams, son of Major-General Sir John Hanbury-Williams.

Through his son Ulysses, Grant was the grandfather of three girls, Edith Clara Grant (1908–1995), who married David Wood Griffiths, Clara Frances Grant (1912–2005), who married Paul Ernest Ruestow, and Julia Grant, who married John S. Dietz.

== Awards ==
- Indian Campaign Medal
- Spanish Campaign Medal
- Army of Puerto Rican Occupation Medal
- Philippine Campaign Medal

== Dates of rank ==
- Cadet, USMA – July 1, 1866
- 2nd Lieutenant, Regular Army – June 12, 1871
- 1st Lieutenant, Regular Army – June 28, 1876
- Lieutenant Colonel, Aide de Camp – March 17, 1873
- Resigned – October 1, 1881
- Colonel, Volunteers – May 2, 1898
- Brigadier General, Volunteers – May 27, 1898
- Brigadier General, Regular Army – February 18, 1901
- Major General, Regular Army – February 6, 1906

Diplomatic posts
| Preceded by Alexander R. Lawton | U.S. Minister to Austria-Hungary; 1889–1893 | Succeeded by Bartlett Tripp |
