= Henry Honoré =

Chicago developer

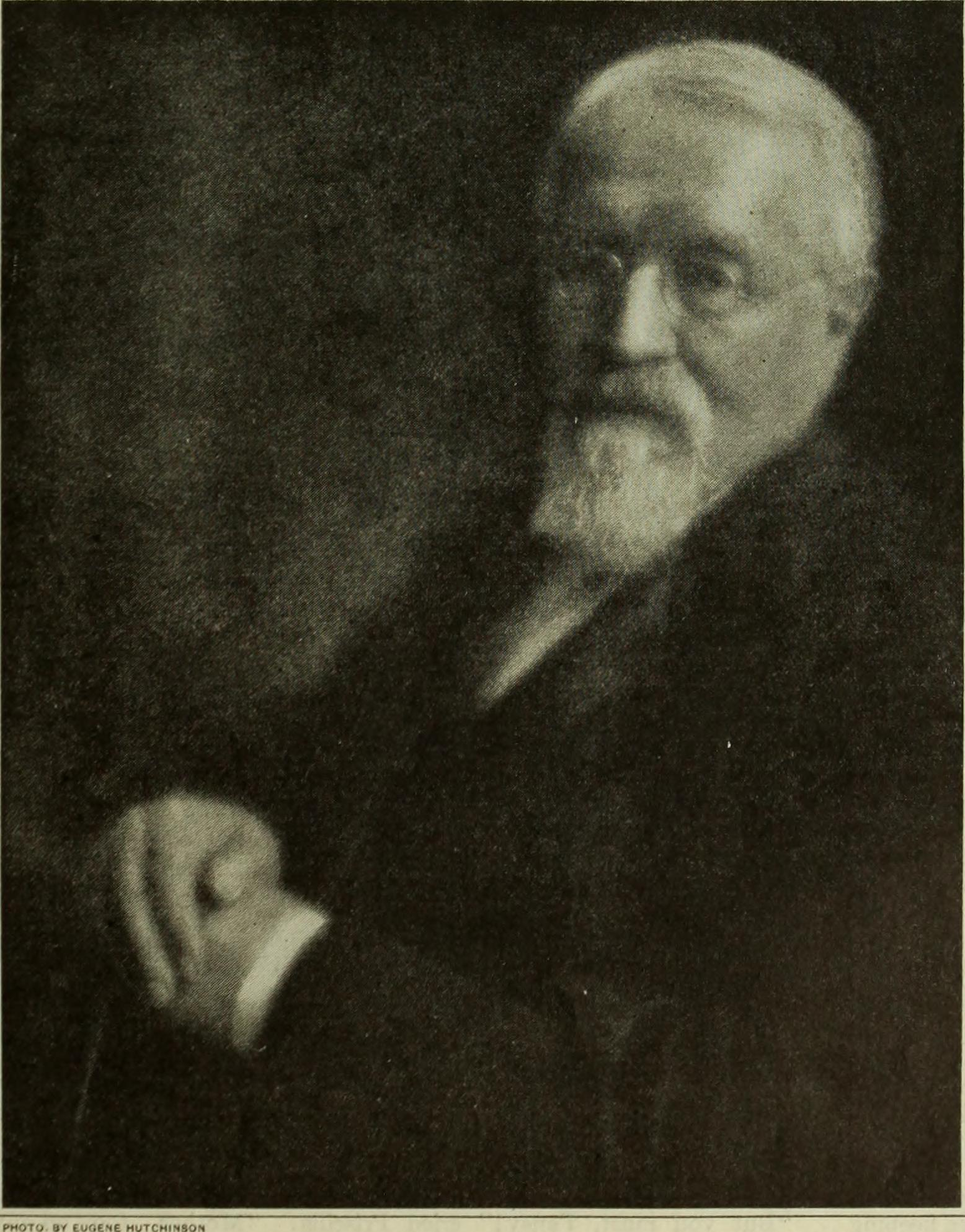
Henry Honoré, by Eugene Raymond Hutchinson

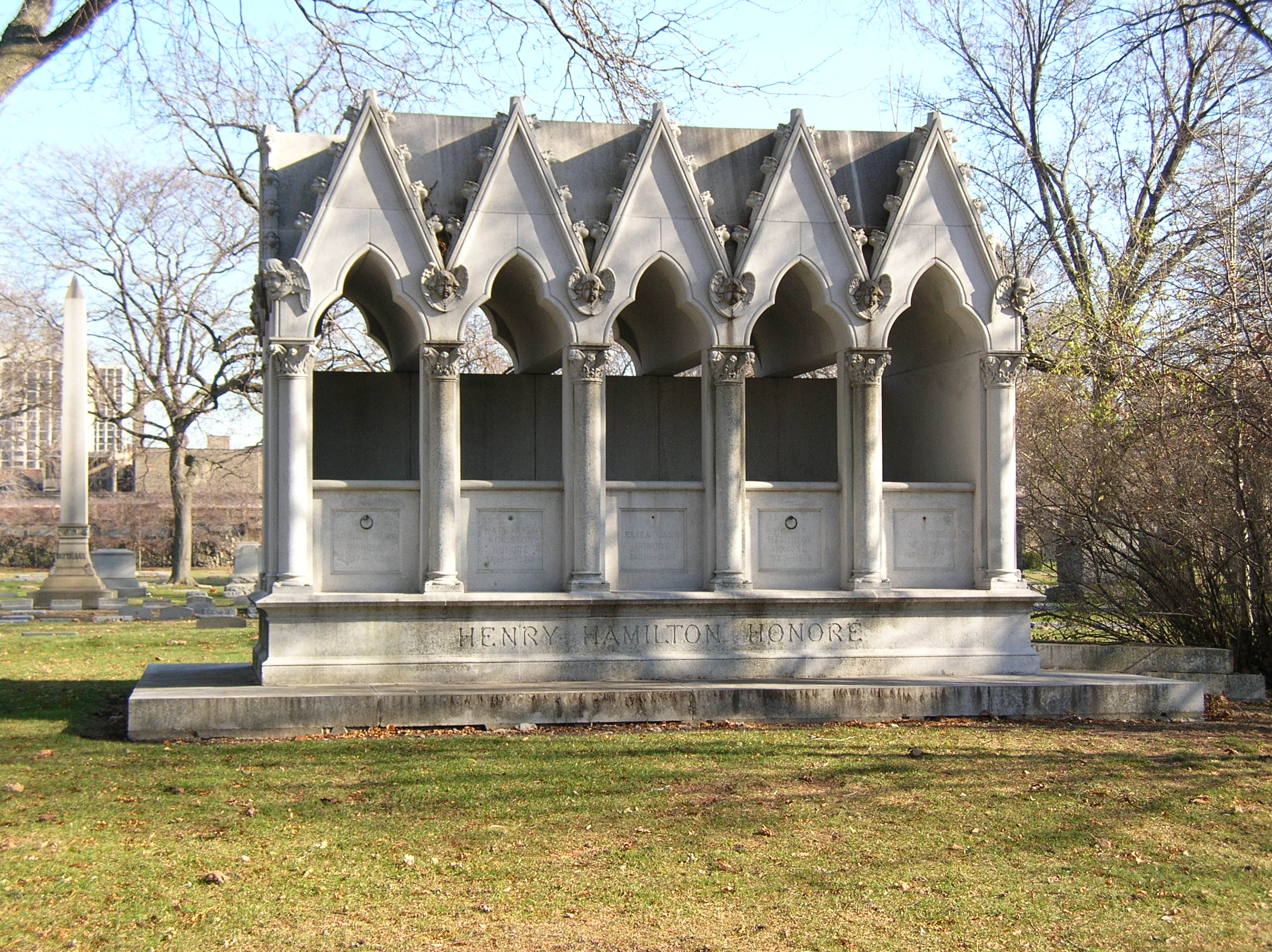
The Honoré family's monument at Graceland Cemetery

Henry Hamilton Honoré (February 19, 1824 – August 16, 1916) was an American businessman.

== Early life ==
Honoré was born on February 19, 1824, in Louisville, Kentucky. He was the son of Francis Honoré (1792–1851) and Matilda D. (née Lockwood) Honoré (1803–1849). His siblings included Mary Ann Honoré, Benjamin Lockwood Honoré, and Francis Leonidis Honoré.

His paternal grandfather, Jean Antoine Honoré, was born in Paris, France from an old aristocratic family and was friends with Gilbert du Motier, Marquis de Lafayette, and moved to America in 1781, becoming a merchant prince and taking an active part in the establishment of Kentucky.

== Career ==
In 1855, Honoré moved from Louisville to Chicago and made his fortune in real estate.

Honoré was responsible for the assemblage of lots and acreage along Dearborn Street, creating an office and commercial district. Honore St. (1832W) in Chicago is named after him. The Honoré Building, at Adams and Dearborn in downtown Chicago, was destroyed during the Great Chicago Fire.

== Personal life ==
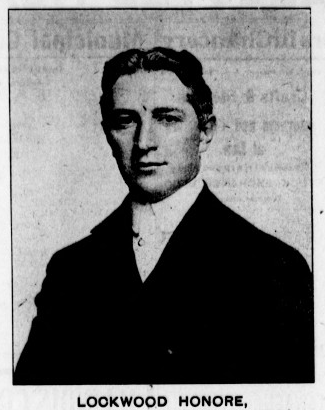
Lockwood Honoré, the youngest son of Henry Honoré

In 1846, Honoré married Eliza Jane Carr (1825–1906), the daughter of Capt. John Carr. Together, they had six children, including:

- Adrian Carr Honoré (1847–1926)
- Bertha "Cissie" Honoré (1849–1918), who married millionaire real estate developer Potter Palmer in 1871.
- Henry Honoré
- Ida Marie Honoré (1854–1930), who married General Frederick Dent Grant, son of President Ulysses S. Grant, in Chicago in 1874.
- Nathaniel Kingston Honoré (1855–1920)
- Lockwood Honoré (1865–1917)

Honoré died in Chicago, at the age of 93, on August 16, 1916.

=== Descendants ===
Through his daughter Ida Marie, Honoré became the grandfather of American writer Julia Dent Cantacuzène Spiransky-Grant, also known as Princess Cantacuzène, who chronicled the Russian Revolution from a first-person perspective.
