= Frederick Dent =

Frederick Dent may refer to:

- Frederick B. Dent (1922–2019), United States Secretary of Commerce
- Frederick Tracy Dent (1820–1892), American general
