= Elisabeth Bagréeff-Speransky =

Russian noblewoman and writer (1799–1857)

- Елизавета Сперанская
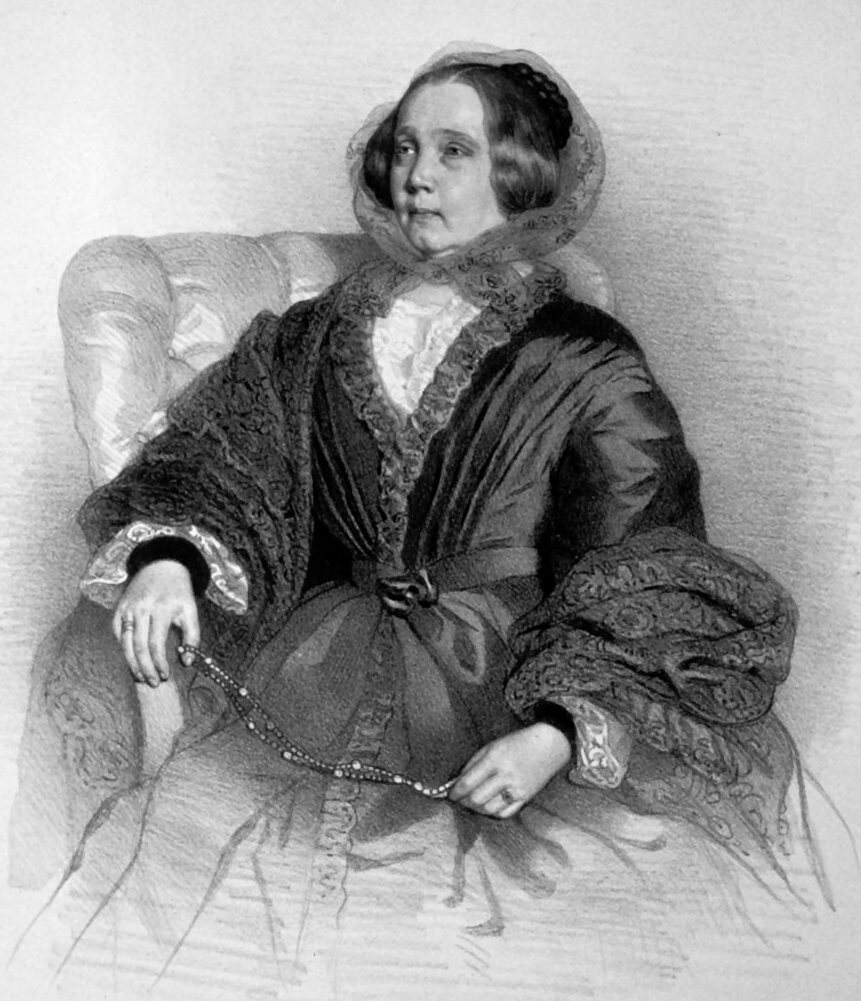
- Lithograph by August Prinzhofer, 1852
- Born: Elizaveta Mikhailovna Speranskaya; 16 September 1799; Saint Petersburg, Russia
- Died: 4 April 1857 (aged 57); Vienna, Austria
- Other names: Elisabeth Froloff-Bagréeff; Elisabeth Froloff-Bagréeff-Speransky; Elisabeth Speranski; Elizabeth Speransky; Elizabeth Speransky-Bagréeff
- Occupation: Writer
- Spouse: Alexander Frolov-Bagreev (m. 1822)
- Children: 3
- Father: Mikhail Speransky
- Relatives: Eliza Stephens (grandmother)

Elisabeth Bagréeff-Speransky (née Elizaveta Mikhailovna Speranskaya; Russian: Елизаве́та Миха́йловна Спера́нская; 16 September [O.S. 5 September] 1799 – 4 April 1857) was a Russian noblewoman and writer. She was the only child of the statesman Mikhail Speransky and his English wife, Elizabeth Stephens. As her mother died when she was two months old, Speranskaya was raised by her grandmother Eliza (née Planta) Stephens and educated by her father. Her studies included history, composition, reading, literature, and languages – English, French, German, Italian, Latin, and Russian. In order to improve her delicate health, she spent her childhood in various places, including Saint Petersburg, Kiev, and Novgorod Governorate, but she also visited her father who was exiled from the capital from 1812 to 1821. Passing the state examination to be a home teacher in 1819, she began teaching children.

In 1822, Speranskaya married Prince Alexander Frolov-Bagreev, the governor of the Chernigov Governorate. The couple had three children, although the youngest died when two years old. They were not well-suited, as she was a charming, salon hostess and he was somber and taciturn. Frolov-Bagreev's failure to manage his business and their personal affairs caused a split between the couple in 1838 which remained unreconciled. She sold her jewels to repay his business debts and her father had to renegotiate Frolov-Bagreev's debts to prevent the loss of their estate at Velyka Burimka in Ukraine. Speranskaya began to travel as a means of overcoming her problems, visiting European cities, including the Dutch resort of Scheveningen, spa villages in Bavaria, Vienna and Salzburg in Austria, Lucerne in Switzerland, various places in the north of Italy. Speranskaya had begun writing in 1828, publishing stories and plays for her children and she wrote poetry on her travels.

Taking over the management of Velyka Burimka in 1842, Speranskaya built schools, orphanages, a brewery and distillery, brick works, carpentry shops, factories, and mills, and reorganized the hospital. She brought in master craftsmen to train the villagers to work in these enterprises. After four years of tiring work, the death of her surviving son, and the pending marriage of her daughter, Speranskaya traveled to Brussels, then to Basel and Geneva in Switzerland, and through Florence, Venice, and Trieste before making a pilgrimage to Egypt and the Holy Land. To prevent her new son-in-law, Prince Rodion Nikolaevich Cantacuzène, taking over the administration of her estate, Speranskaya returned to Ukraine in 1847 and managed Velyka Burimka for the next three years until her health failed. Traveling to Vienna to seek medical treatment, she made an arrangement for her daughter and son-in-law to manage the estate and share the profits with her. Instead, they tried to sell it and managed to reduce what they owed her, knowing she was too ill to travel and contest their actions.

As a distraction from her legal and physical problems, Speranskaya revived her role as hostess to a well-known salon and began to write, publishing under the surname Bagréeff-Speransky (or Bagréeff-Speranski). Between 1852 and 1857 she wrote thirty-two books, mostly in French and German. These included religious texts, travel sketches, stories of life in the Russian Empire, novels, plays, and children's books. Her writing was popular with European audiences and gained favorable reviews from scholars like Jakob Philipp Fallmerayer and Prosper Mérimée. Bagréeff-Speransky died in April 1857 in Vienna. She and her father were described with unfavorable caricatures in Count Leo Tolstoy's classic novel War and Peace, but modern scholarship has reviewed letters exchanged by the father and daughter which disprove Tolstoy's depiction. She was included in numerous biographical lexicons in the nineteenth and early twentieth centuries, while in recent years interest in her life and work has been renewed.

== Early life and education ==
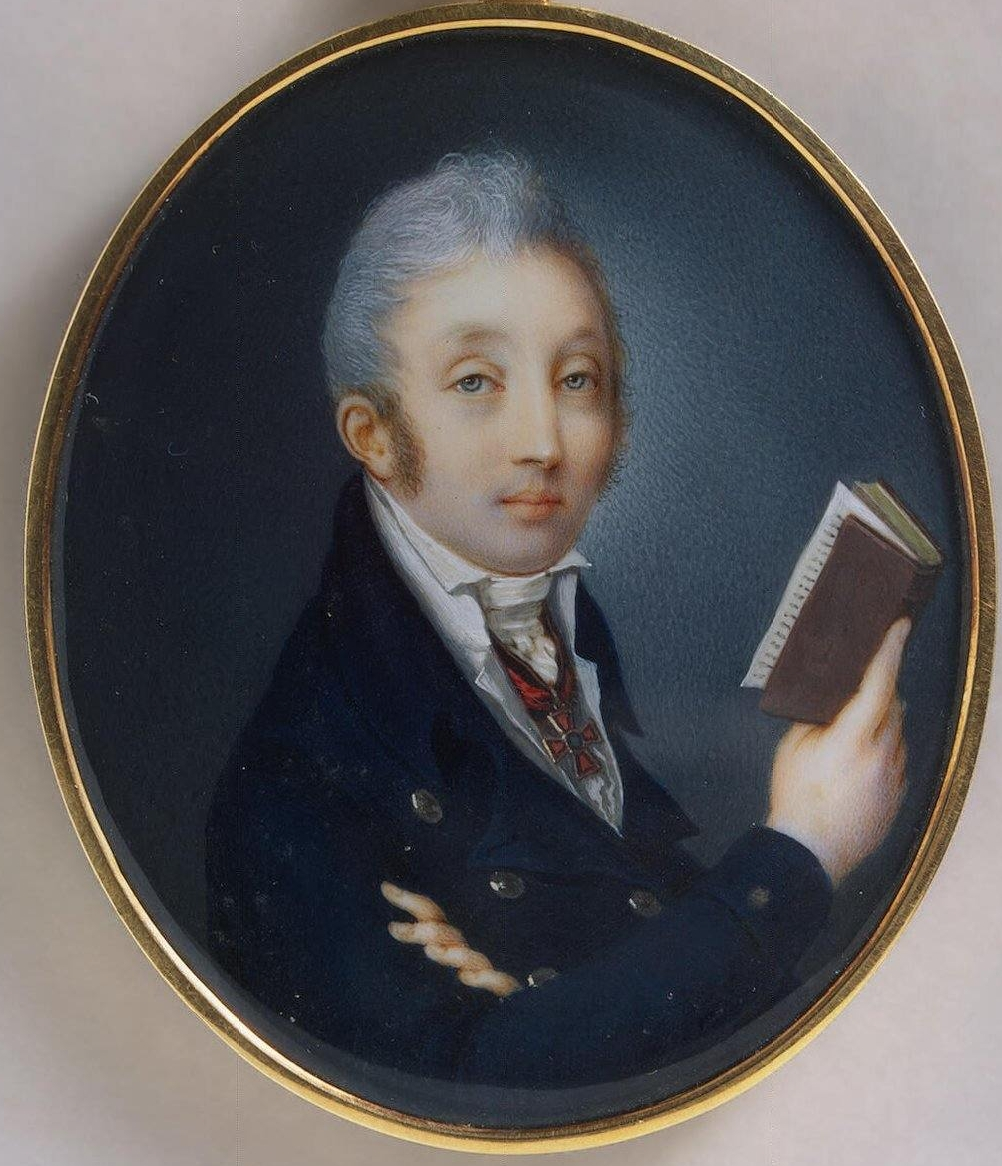
Mikhail Speransky, 1806 by Pavel Alexeyevich Ivanov

Elizaveta Mikhailovna Speranskaya was born on 16 September 1799 (N.S.) in Saint Petersburg, Russian Empire, to Elizabeth Jane (née Stephens) and Mikhail Speransky. (Note: Swiss writer Victor Duret stated that Elizaveta was born according to the Russian calendar on 17 September 1799. Russian academic Ksenia Andreevna Sozinova reviewed letters written by the couple and stated Elizaveta was born on 5 September 1799, which is confirmed by Speransky's biographer, Modest Andreyevich Korff. Conversion of that date would be one day prior to the date given by Duret, because when he wrote in 1867 a twelve-day difference existed, but by the twentieth century, an eleven-day conversion factor was used. Austria changed from the Julian calendar to the Gregorian calendar in 1583. Russia did not change from the Julian calendar until February 1918. To avoid confusion all dates are given in New Style, or Gregorian format, unless noted otherwise.) Stephens was the daughter of the English woman, Eliza (née Planta) Stephens, and had moved with her mother to Russia around 1789, after the death of her father Rev. Henry Stephens. (Note: English historian, Wendy Moore, stated that Planta was pregnant at the time she eloped with Stephens and that the child's biological father was likely Andrew Robinson Stoney. The couple eloped in 1776, and Elizabeth is typically given as the oldest child that came with her mother to Russia: Elizabeth, Francis, and Marianne. Her birth year is often given as 1779, but she was baptized in 1778, Francis in 1780, and Marianne in 1784.) Eliza served as a governess to Countess Catherine Shuvalova, who allowed the children Elizabeth, Marianne, and Francis to live with their mother. While studying with Andrew Samborski at his summer cottage, Stephens met Mikhail Speransky in 1797. Speransky was a graduate of the Alexander Nevsky Seminary and had that year entered the civil service. The couple married at the end of 1798, but Stephens died from tuberculosis in November 1799, two months after their daughter's birth. (Note: Several sources note that her tuberculosis was brought on when she fell from a coach and landed on a large watch which injured her chest. Physician J. Browning Alexander, who published an article in the Journal of the Royal Institute of Public Health and Hygiene in 1953, confirms that the bacteria which causes the disease can remain latent in a person until triggered by an external trauma.)

Speransky was distraught over his wife's death and buried himself in his work. He sent his daughter to live with a former nurse of the Stephens family who lived along the Vyborgskaya Embankment, opposite Aptekarsky Island. He requested his mother-in-law's help in 1801, when he was promoted to serve as an "Assistant Minister of Justice, as Governor of Finland, as Privy Councillor, and as Secretary of State" to Alexander, the new Tsar of Russia. Eliza was in Vienna when her daughter died. Her charge, Alexandra Shuvalova, had married Franz Joseph, Prince of Dietrichstein in 1797, and relocated there. In 1801, Eliza was able to return to Saint Petersburg and moved into Speransky's house to care for Speranskaya. The following year when Speranskaya's aunt Marianne married Konstantin Zlobin, Eliza's family with Speranskaya all moved into the home of Marianne's father-in-law, Vasily Zlobin.

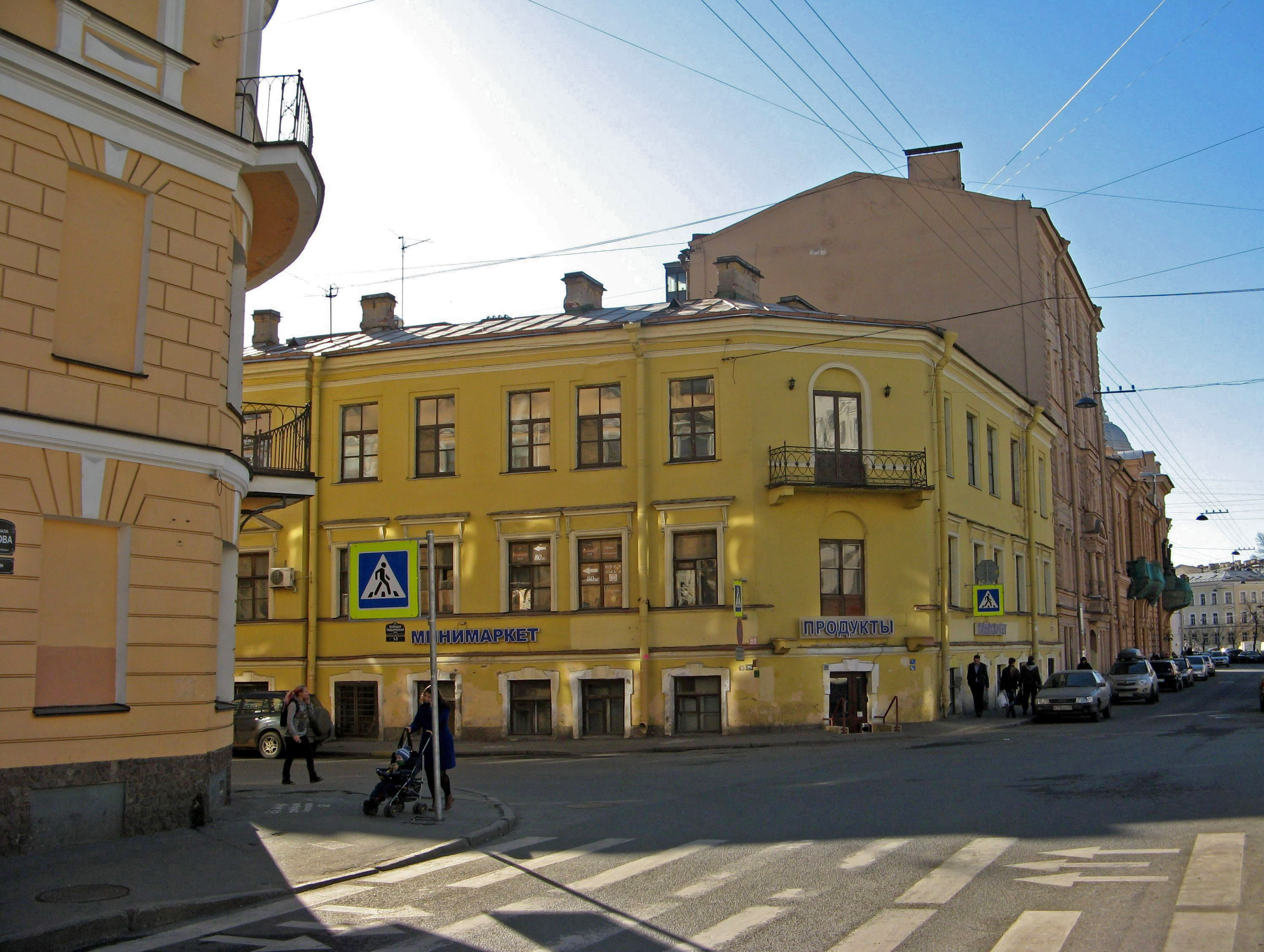
Vasily Zlobin's home (Griboyedov Canal Embankment, #84 Bolshaya Podyachevskaya Street, Saint Petersburg

Within six months the couple were having difficulties and Vasily, who was fond of his daughter-in-law suggested a temporary separation, sending Marianne and her family to Baldone (now in Latvia) to enjoy the sulfur water spa there. By the time they returned in the autumn, Konstantin had abandoned the family. For more than a year, Vasily tried in vain to negotiate a reconciliation, although the couple did not divorce until 1810. The Stephens family moved back in with Speransky briefly, but because of Speranskaya's delicate health, they left Saint Petersburg for Kiev (present-day Ukraine), where they remained until 1809. That year Speransky bought a house in Saint Petersburg near the Tauride Garden and the family returned as Speranskaya's health had improved. Marianne died in 1811, leaving her estate Velikopolye in the Novgorod Oblast to her niece Speranskaya. (Note: Korff notes that this estate was purchased by Speransky for Marianne from monies she had received from her father-in-law, Vasily Zlobin, and himself.) In March 1812, after her father fell out of favor with the tsar, primarily because of his inability to cooperate or ingratiate himself with Russian nobility, he was sent into exile. He left a note for Speranskaya that she and her grandmother were to join him in Nizhny Novgorod, as soon as it could be arranged. Once they were reunited, Speransky developed an educational program for his daughter, teaching her history, composition, reading, literature, and various languages. She learned German by reading the Bible and Friedrich Schiller's work on Joan of Arc and also studied the works of William Shakespeare. She gained fluency in English, French, German, and Russian and learned to read Latin and write in Italian.

In late summer 1812, Speransky was separated from his daughter and sent to the Siberian border near Perm. Despite their separation, he continued to supervise Speranskaya's education. She and her grandmother were sent back to Saint Petersburg at the end of 1813, although they visited him from time to time at Perm and later when he was moved to Speranskaya's estate Velikopolye near Novgorod. Historian Marc Raeff stated that Eliza and Speranskaya brought money for him to live on in exile, and both Raeff and William Blackwood noted that when Speransky had trouble getting missives delivered to Tsar Alexander describing his penury, Speranskaya was able to deliver a letter to the emperor, who allotted her father an annual stipend. At the beginning of 1814, Speransky requested that his daughter, whom he called Lisa or Lise, should move back to Velikopolye, where he joined her later in the year. That year, Speransky returned to government service in various provincial posts. In 1815, Speransky sent Eliza to live in Kiev, where she died at the end of the year. Speranskaya returned to Saint Petersburg, where she resided with a family friend, Maria (née Amburger) Weikard, the wife of the Shuvalova family's physician.

== Marriage and family life ==
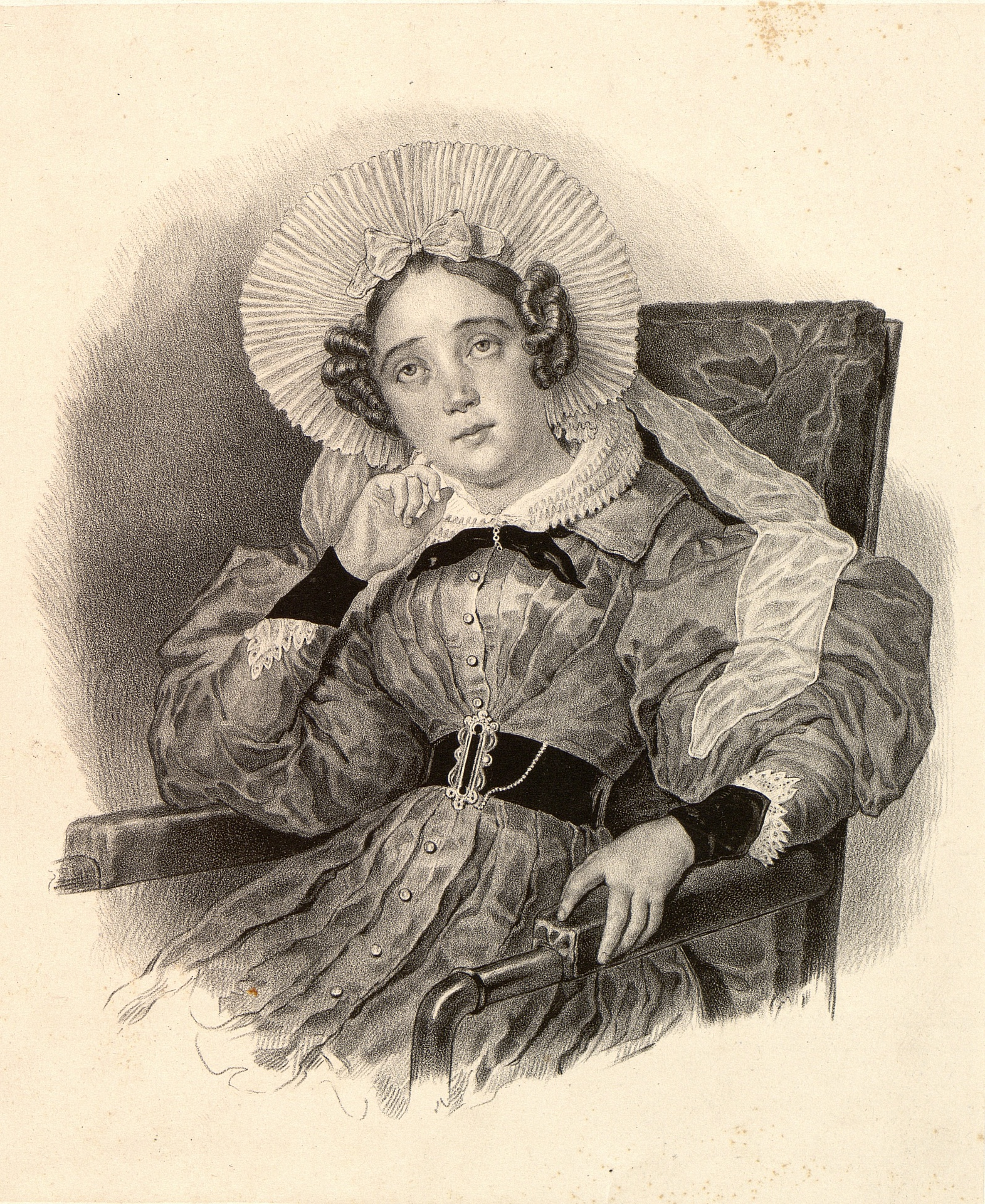
Speranskaya, 1820–1830

Speranskaya passed the state examination to be a home teacher in 1819 and began teaching children. In 1821, Speransky returned to Saint Petersburg. Blackwood states that it was because of an inappropriate love interest between his daughter and a military officer, who historian Erik Amburger identifies as Georg Weikard. The relationship was terminated but Speranskaya became despondent and attempted suicide. Speransky began to draft plans to reorganize the provincial governments for more efficiency and took charge of finding Speranskaya a suitable husband, hosting numerous social events to allow her the opportunity to mix with society. She became the companion of Maria Kochubey, who treated her as if she were a daughter and Speranskaya resigned herself to allow her father to choose her husband. That year, she was appointed as a lady-in-waiting to Elizabeth Alexeievna, Empress of Russia.

In August 1822, Speranskaya married Prince Alexander Frolov-Bagreev, the governor of the Chernigov Governorate. Frolov-Bagreev was the nephew of Kochubey's husband, the brother of his mother, Agrafena Pavlovna Kochubey. Initially, they lived in Chernihiv, but in May 1824 the couple moved to Saint Petersburg when Frolov-Bagreev took a post in the Ministry of Finance of the Russian Empire. The couple were not well-suited, as Speranskaya's circle were intellectuals and artists while Frolov-Bagreev was a dull simpleton. He was described by Speranskaya's biographer, Victor Duret, as "égoïste et méfiant" (selfish and distrustful), although he exhibited polite manners. He was often silent, behaving with an air of superiority and completely ignoring his wife. Speranskaya was a charismatic and charming hostess whose salon was attended by Saint Petersburg's celebrated artists, scientists, and statesmen. Among her frequent guests were Alexander and Karl Bryullov, Nikolay Karamzin, Adam Mickiewicz, Alexander Pushkin, Ivan Turgenev, and Pyotr Vyazemsky. Pushkin remained a close friend until his death.

At the beginning of 1824, the couple had a son, whom they named Mikhail, and two years later, a daughter, Maria. During this time, Frolov-Bagreev had mismanaged funds at the bank and lost a large sum of money, which Speranskaya rectified by selling her jewels. In 1825, Tsar Alexander died and was succeeded after the Decembrist revolt by his brother, Nicholas. Speranskaya brought an English governess to help her with the children and in 1828 published her first book, Чтение для малолетних детей (Readings for Young Children) for them. She wrote other children's stories and short plays for them and began publishing stories anonymously in local newspapers. Her second son, Alexander, was born around 1830 but died when two-years old. (Note: Duret states that the second son was born five years after Maria's 1826 birth. Blackwood says only that the second son was the youngest child, and Korff gives his birth year as 1828. The article on Russian Wikipedia shows Alexander was baptized in 1830.) In 1831, Speransky borrowed money and bought his daughter an estate, Velyka Burimka, where she raised her children. The estate covered 92,000 acres (370 km^{2}) and encompassed seven villages. Devastated by her son's death, Speranskaya left the Russian Empire for the first time in 1833 and traveled to the Dutch seaside resort of Scheveningen, where she wrote poetry in English and Russian.

Under the arrangement agreed upon by Speransky and his son-in-law, Frolov-Bagreev was to repay the amount which had been borrowed to purchase the estate, while also managing it. Although Speranskaya created model farms, wood distribution facilities, dispensaries, and schools to ensure the welfare of her family and community, her husband's mismanagement of the estate and failure to pay even the interest on the loans for three years found them facing foreclosure. With great difficulty, an agreement was reached by 1838 to ward off the loss of the estate, but the relationship did not survive and the couple thereafter lived separately. In early 1839, Tsar Nicholas made Speransky a count and granted him an income, but he died on 23 February (O.S.). Speranskaya asked if her son could bear the name Speransky, keep the title, and as was customary, receive her father's pension for six years, but her request was denied.

To prevent her estranged husband from seizing her father's estate, Speranskaya sent their son to a boarding school and in July traveled abroad with their daughter, on the pretext that she needed a spa cure. They went to Bavaria and stayed at Bad Kissingen and then Bad Gastein before wintering in Frankfurt. They returned to the Bavarian baths in the summer of 1840. She also took short trips to England to visit her family there and to Darmstadt in Germany. Speranskaya and her daughter then visited the Duchy of Salzburg and traveled by steamboat down the Danube to Vienna. In May 1841, they left the Austrian capital and traveled to Styria, continuing through the Illyrian Provinces to Lucerne in Switzerland and on to northern Italy. During her travels, she wrote poetry in English. They returned to Austria, staying first in Baden and then wintering in Vienna. In answer to a letter from her husband, she advised that they might return to Saint Petersburg in the summer of 1842.

== Career ==
=== Estate manager (1842–1850) ===
After receiving a letter from the foreman at the Velyka Burimka estate, Speranskaya decided to go there instead, as in her absence Frolov-Bagreev had once again mismanaged it and the serfs were struggling. Traveling through Galicia, she and her daughter made their way through Podolia to Volhynia and Kiev before arriving in Poltava near her estate. She found miserable conditions – starvation due to famine and bad harvests, as well as rampant disease, such as dysentery, scurvy and whooping cough. She immediately took measures to rectify the situation bringing in wheat, meat, and vegetables and setting up child care centers and orphanages to serve children whose parents were unable to provide for them. She bought livestock to distribute to those who had lost their animals and reorganized the village hospital, which had fallen into ruin.

Speranskaya finally returned to Saint Petersburg in August 1842 and was greeted by her son, who had become an officer in the Russian Imperial Guard. She rented a house near her son's garrison and informed her husband that since he did not want the responsibility, she was taking control of the estate at Velyka Burimka. The expense of living in Saint Petersburg and the need to provide for her estate forced Speranskaya to sell one of her father's estates near Penza and return to the south in February 1843. By hiring master craftsmen to train the local peasants as apprentices, she was able to restore the brewery and the stables, and to establish not only a brickyard, carpentry shop, distillery, forge, saltpetre factory, and a sawmill, but also windmills, watermills, and a spinning mill. She created elementary schools for children and trade workshops for teenagers who were not yet ready to work in the fields or enter professions. In February 1844 her son Mikhail was transferred to a garrison near her Ukraine estate and her daughter, whom she had educated herself, was sent to live with her father to complete her education. Mikhail died a few months later, when during an expedition in the Caucasus he tried to stop two drunken soldiers from fighting and was slashed with a sword.

Speranskaya's daughter returned to live with her and became engaged to Prince Rodion Nikolaevich Cantacuzène later in 1844. Her husband died from a stroke without the couple reconciling the following year. For a second time, she chose to travel to distract herself from distress over the loss of her son. She left Velyka Burimka in January 1846 to take a cure for gout at Baden bei Wien. After four months in Vienna, Speranskaya spent two months in Paris and then traveled on to Brussels, Basel, Geneva, Florence and Venice, before arriving in Trieste where her daughter was married that year on 19 November. After the wedding, Speranskaya resumed traveling, going to Egypt and Palestine. During her absence, she hired a series of administrators to take care of the estate. Accusing one of them of mismanagement, her new son-in-law, Cantacuzène, attempted to take over as steward. To prevent him doing do, she returned to Ukraine in June 1847 and resumed management. For the next two years, Speranskaya worked to restore the profitability of Velyka Burimka but her efforts impacted her health. In July 1850, she reached an agreement with her daughter whereby the Cantacuzènes could take over the estate on condition they shared the profits, while she proceeded to Vienna to seek medical treatment.

=== Writer (1850–1857) ===
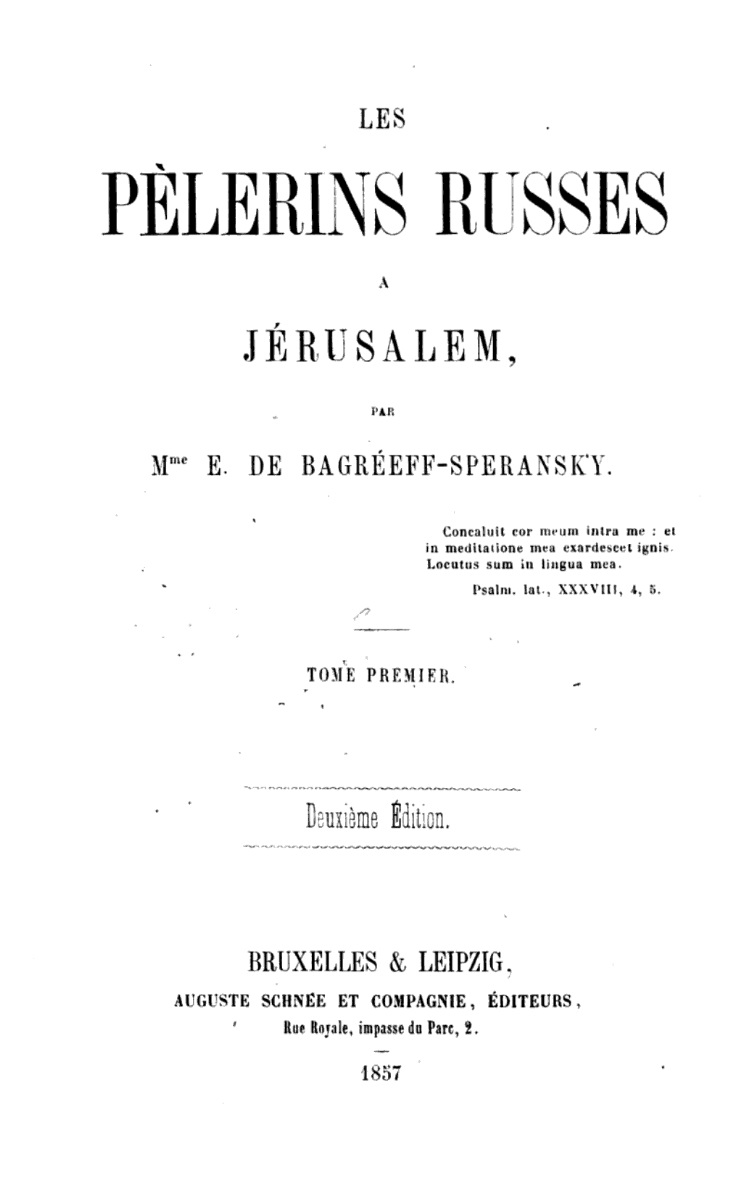
Les Pèlerins Russes à Jérusalem, 1857 edition

Within six months of arriving in Vienna, Speranskaya's daughter wrote to her wanting to reduce the payments due and Cantacuzène asked the emperor to allow Speranskaya to sell her estate so that she could expatriate. Although she had no intention of selling, Speranskaya was too ill to return home to fight their claims and agreed to have her income reduced. She wrote to the tsar explaining her situation and begged him to allow her to remain in Vienna. He agreed, provided the estate was not sold. Despite the tsar's intervention, she often had trouble renewing her residency permit with the Ministry of Justice in Vienna until 1854, when Alexander Gorchakov replaced the previous minister. During this time, as a distraction from her legal and physical problems, Speranskaya began to write, using a French spelling of her married surname Bagréeff-Speransky (or Bagréeff-Speranski), sometimes rendered in English as Speransky-Bagréeff. She also revived her role as hostess to a well-known salon, often attended by notables like Franz Grillparzer and Betty Paoli. She traveled to Paris and various places in Germany in 1856, visiting friends like Alfred de Falloux, Sophie Swetchine and Maria Soldan. When she returned, she offered her father's papers to the new tsar, Alexander II, who not only accepted the gift, but granted her a pension.

The first of these works was Méditations chrétiennes (Christian Meditations), written in 1852 and published in Vienna in 1853. Before her death, Bagréeff-Speransky published thirty-two works in French, German, and Russian covering a variety of genres. She wrote religious texts, travel sketches, stories of life in the Russian Empire, as well as novels, plays, and children's books. She also acted as an advisor to Korff who was preparing a biography of her father's life. Among her most popular works were Méditations chrétiennes (1853), Les pélerins russes à Jérusalem (Russian Pilgrims in Jerusalem, 1854), Les dernières heures de l'empereur Nicolas (The Last Hours of Emperor Nicholas, 1855), La vie de château en Ukraine (Life in the Ukrainian Chateau, 1857), Le Starower et sa fille (The Old Believer and His Daughter, 1857), Une Famille Toungouse (A Tunguz Family, 1857) and Les îles de la Néva à St. Pétersbourg (The Islands of the Neva in Saint Petersburg, 1858).

Les pélerins russes à Jérusalem told of her pilgrimage to Palestine, La vie de château chronicled her experiences in and around Kiev and contained a collection of short stories, and Les îles de la Néva described the vicinity of the capital city of the Tsardom of Russia. Une Famille Toungouse related her experiences in Siberia and spoke of the customs of the Evenk people and their encounters and clashes with Christians and Cossacks who traveled to their traditional homelands, uprooting their nomadic lives. Her novel Irene focused on the benefits of education and was compared by Blackwood to the works by Maria Edgeworth. The novella "Pokritka" ("The Evicted One"), published shortly before her death, was a tragedy about an old woman being removed from her estate. Her works were reviewed favorably by scholars like Jakob Philipp Fallmerayer and Prosper Mérimée. Mérimée said that he found her works so interesting that he wanted to visit Russia.

== Death and legacy ==
Bagréeff-Speransky died in Vienna on 4 April 1857 from an ear infection, a severe headache, or tuberculosis, and was buried in St. Marx Cemetery. Her daughter Maria inherited the Velyka Burimka estate and lived there until her death in 1887. Celebrations in honor of the centennial of Speransky's birth were held in Saint Petersburg in 1872, and Maria, over her husband's objection, successfully asked Tsar Alexander II to have Speransky's title granted to her son, Mikhail Rodionovich Cantacuzène (born 1847). Mikhail married Elizabeth Sicard and their oldest son Mikhail became the husband of Julia Dent Grant, granddaughter of United States President Ulysses S. Grant in 1899. The estate was burned and looted by the Bolsheviks during the Ukrainian–Soviet War in 1918. When the area became Soviet Ukraine in 1919, the family fled, first to Kiev and then abroad to Constantinople, Malta, and eventually Paris.

At the time of her death, Bagréeff-Speransky was remembered for the memoirs she had published about Russia. Both she and her father were discussed in Count Leo Tolstoy's classic novel War and Peace, (Volume II, Part III). According to scholars Raeff and Sara Dickinson, Tolstoy made an unfavorable caricature of Speransky and depicted Bagréeff-Speransky as a lonely child, who lacked her father's attention. Raeff maintained Tolstoy's depiction of Speransky was incorrect, while Dickinson emphasized that letters exchanged between father and daughter showed that even during their periods of separation, they had a close and affectionate relationship.

Dickinson noted that Bagréeff-Speransky was not included in the 1994 Dictionary of Russian Women Writers edited by Marina Ledkovsky, Charlotte Rosenthal, and Mary Zirin, possibly because she lived abroad, wrote anonymously, published infrequently, and rarely produced work in Russian. However, Bagréeff-Speransky is included in numerous earlier biographical dictionaries, such as the Biographical Encyclopedia of the Austrian Empire (1858), Brockhaus and Efron Encyclopedic Dictionary (1902), Nordisk familjebok (1904), and the Russian Biographical Dictionary (1901). Still earlier, Duret published Un portrait russe (A Russian Portrait, 1867) which gave a biographical account of her life and various writings, both published and unpublished. Duret edited and posthumously published her reflections and diary, written between 1845 and her death, under the title "Le livre d'une femme" ("A Woman's Book") for the first time in 1867. A review in the Magazin für die Literatur des Auslandes (Magazine for Foreign Literature, Berlin) published that year indicated that it was a work which would appeal to religious women who were self-reflective. Daniil Mordovtsev included a chapter on her in his book Русские женщины Нового времени (Russian Women of Modern Times, 1874), which covered correspondence from Bagréeff-Speransky and her father. According to Dickinson, modern scholarship is revisiting her life and works.

== Selected works ==
- Bagréeff-Speransky, Mme E. de (1854). Les pèlerins russes à Jérusalem [Russian Pilgrims in Jerusalem] (in French). Vol. 1. Brussels, Belgium: Kiessling, Schnee et compagnie. OCLC 9534965.
- Bagréeff-Speranski, Mme E. de (1855). Les dernières Heures de sa Majeste l'Empereur Nicolas: Méditation par l'auteur des pélerins Russes à Jerusalem [The Last Hours of His Majesty the Emperor Nicholas: Meditation by the Author of Russian Pilgrims in Jerusalem] (in French). Leipzig, Germany: François Wagner. OCLC 644311421.
- Bagréeff-Speranski, Mme E. de (1857). Irène ou les influences de l'éducation suivi de la vieille et son corbeau [Irene or the Influences of Education Followed by the Old Woman and Her Crow] (in French). Brussels, Belgium: Auguste Schnee et compagnie. OCLC 300100867.
- Bagréeff-Speranski, Mme E. de (1857). La vie de château en Ukraine [Life in the Ukrainian Chateau] (in French). Brussels, Belgium: Auguste Schnee et compagnie. OCLC 741482154.
- Bagréeff-Speranski, Mme E. de (1857). Le Starower et sa fille suivi de Xenia ou les deux rêves [The Starower and His Daughter Followed by Xenia or The Two Dreams] (in French). Brussels, Belgium: Auguste Schnee et compagnie. OCLC 300100469.
- Bagréeff-Speransky, Mme E. de (1857). Les pèlerins russes à Jérusalem [Russian Pilgrims in Jerusalem] (in French). Vol. 2 (2 ed.). Brussels, Belgium: Auguste Schnee et compagnie. OCLC 17909992.
- Bagréeff-Speranski, Mme E. de (1857). Une Famille Toungouse: Esquisses de Moeurs Russes [A Tungus Family: Sketches of Russian Mores] (in French). Brussels, Belgium: Auguste Schnee et compagnie. OCLC 300100798.
- Bagréeff-Speranski, Mme E. de (1858). Les îles de la Néva à St. Pétersbourg [The Islands of the Neva in Saint Petersburg] (in French). Brussels, Belgium: Auguste Schnee et compagnie. OCLC 734052322.
