= Prince Mikhail Cantacuzène =

Russian general and prince (1875–1955)

Prince Mikhail Mikhailovich Cantacuzène
- Count Speransky
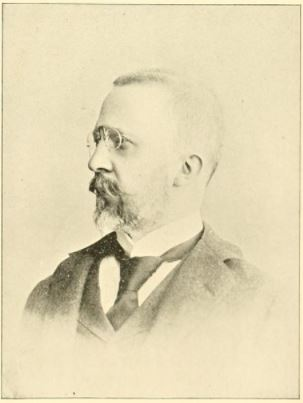
- Full name: Mikhail (Michael) Mikhailovich Cantacuzène
- Born: 29 April 1875; Poltava, Russian Empire
- Died: 25 March 1955 (aged 79); Sarasota, Florida, U.S.
- Buried: Manasota Memorial Park, Sarasota
- Noble family: Cantacuzino
- Spouses: Julia Dent Grant (m. 1899; div. 1934) Jeannette Draper (m. 1940; died 1955)
- Issue: Prince Michael Mikhailovich; Princess Bertha Mikhailovna; Princess Zenaida Mikhailovna
- Father: Prince Mikhail Rodionovich Cantacuzène
- Mother: Elisabeth Siscard

Prince Mikhail Mikhailovich Cantacuzène, Count Speransky (Russian: Михаи́л Миха́йлович Кантаку́зин, граф Сперанский; 29 April 1875 – 25 March 1955) was a Russian general. The title of Count Speransky has been alternatively spelled "Spiransky" and "Speranski".

== Early life ==
Prince Michael (or Mikhail) was Prince Mikhail Mikhailovich Cantacuzène, was born on 29 April 1875 in Poltava, in Poltava Governorate of the Russian Empire (now Ukraine). He was born at his family's estate which was known as Bouromka, in Poltava. The eldest of four children, he was a son of Prince Mikhail Rodionovich Cantacuzène and Elisabeth Sicard. His two younger brothers were Prince Boris (1876–1905) and Prince Serge (1884-1953) and his younger sister was Princess Daria (1878–1944).

A member of the Cantacuzino family, a Russian branch of which is an offshoot of the Moldavian branch, the titles of Prince of Imperial Russia and of Count Speransky were confirmed to Mikhail's grandfather, Prince Rodion Nikolaevich Cantacuzène, in 1865 by Alexander II. The title had formerly been held by his great-grandfather, Mikhail Speransky, Russian statesman and one-time adviser to Tsar Alexander I. The Prince's father had inherited the Speransky title, unusually and on basis of special remainder, from his own maternal grandmother, Elisabeth Bagréeff-Speransky, who was a daughter of the first Count Speransky. The title of count was confirmed in 1872. The Russian princely titles of the Cantacuzène were inherited via the Romanian line of Cantacuzène, with the service of Michael's great-grandfather Radu, Rodion Matveevich, Cantacuzène, who came from Romania to serve under Catherine the Great. (Note: The princely titles were confirmed at that time (c. 1772) under the Russian tradition of military service granting transfer of foreign titles. In a matter of fact, they were not strictly princely in Romania, but were male line descendants from the Kantakouzenos emperors of Constantinople.) His mother's family were French Huguenot merchants who also emigrated to Russia during the reign of Catherine the Great; her family's wealth included the estate of Bouromka, several apartments in St. Petersburg, a villa in the Crimea, and an apartment in Paris. His mother was exiled to Portuguese East Africa (Mozambique) and was buried in Macequece (now called Villa de Manica).

Mikhail attended Page Corps in St. Petersburg, and later became a graduate of the Imperial Alexandrine Lycée.

== Career ==
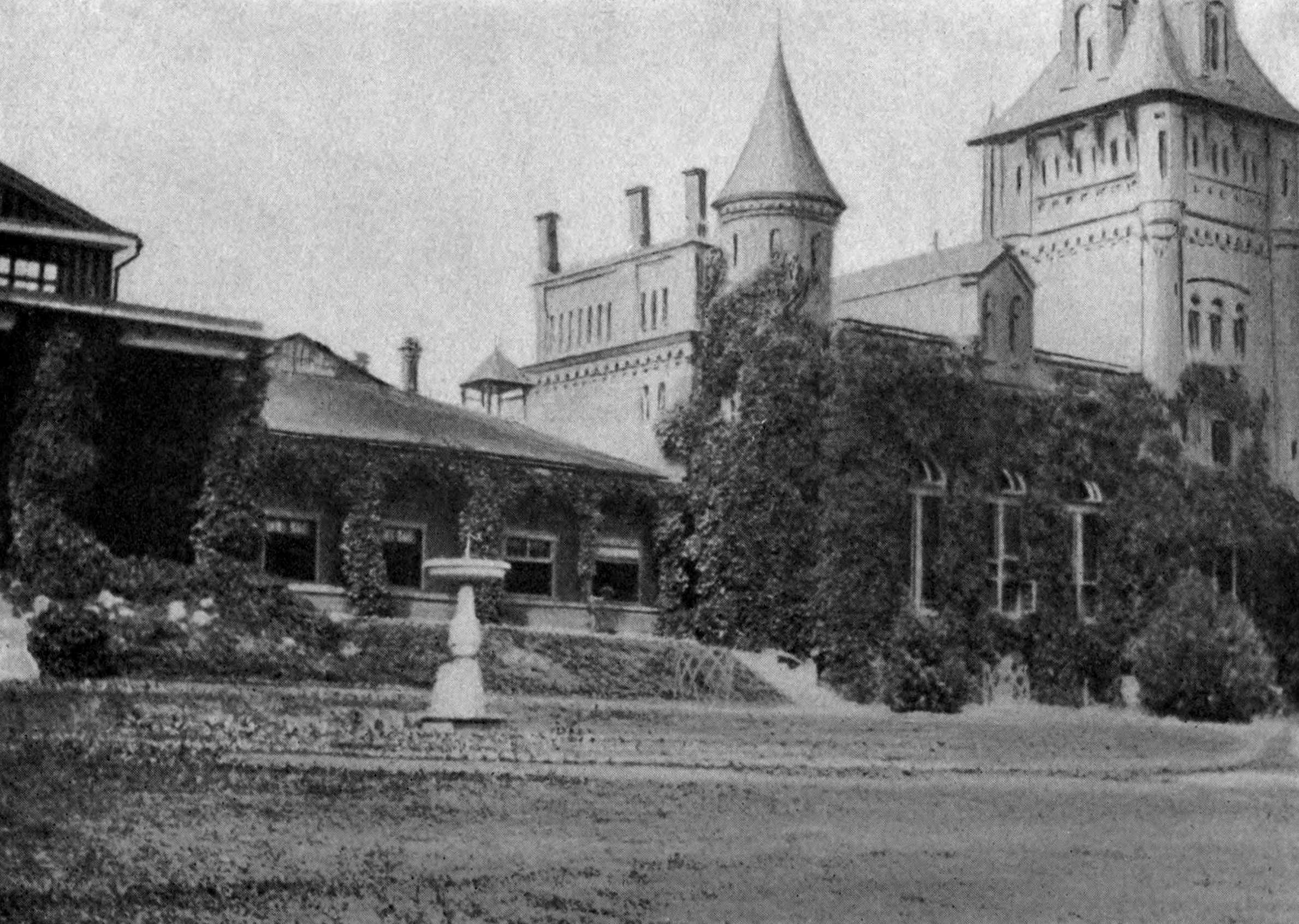
Bouromka

His military career formed the basis of his life before and after his diplomatic service, as he served in both the Russo-Japanese War of 1904 to 1905, and on the Polish front during the First World War.

During World War I, Prince Cantacuzène served as aide-de-camp and later Major-General, and finally General, in the service of Tsar Nicholas II, while Princess Cantacuzène remained in St. Petersburg. He served with distinction and was wounded during the Battle of Galicia in 1914; as commander of the South Russia Cossacks, in 1915 he led 15,000 men in what has been called the last great cavalry charge against a fortified position in military history. The family left Russia in the aftermath of the Russian Revolution; in 1917, they escaped from Petrograd with her jewels sewn into her clothing and fled, via Finland, to the United States. The couple moved to Washington, D.C. and attempted to attract support for a counter-revolution in Russia, but after news of the assassination of the Tsar and of his brother, Grand Duke Michael Alexandrovich of Russia, ended their activism. The couple relocated to Sarasota, Florida, joining the firm founded by her aunt Bertha Palmer.

After his divorce, his former wife's cousins, Honore Palmer and Potter Palmer Jr. (both sons of Bertha Palmer), who remained in Sarasota after Bertha's death, expanded their agricultural and business enterprises, and brought (former Prince) Michael Cantacuzene into the Palmer corporate structure. He managed the 1,200-acre (4.9 km^{2}) Hyde Park citrus groves, helped organize the Palmer Bank when it opened in 1929, and became Vice President of the bank.

== Personal life ==
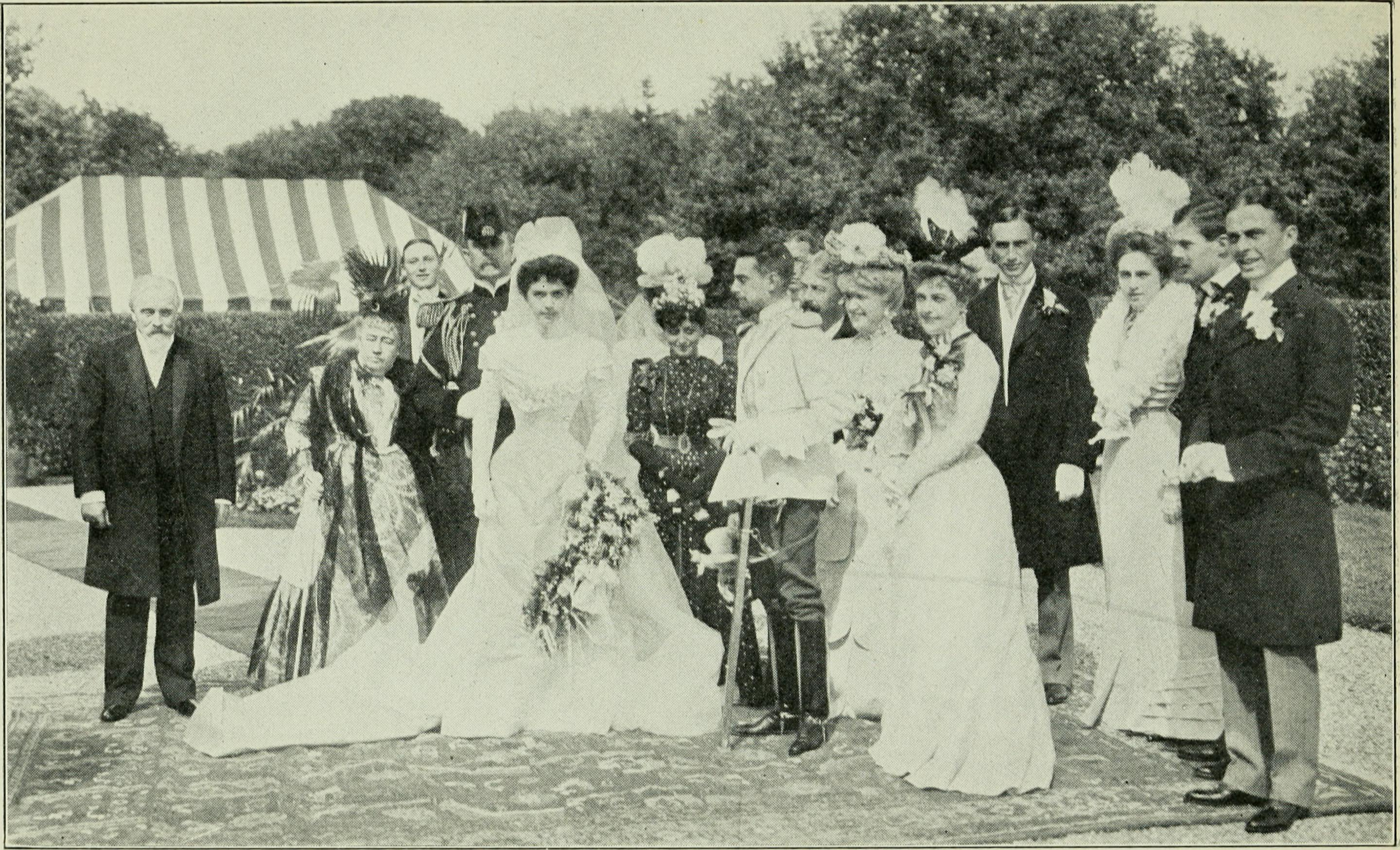
Part of the Cantacuzene Wedding Party in Newport

Prince Mikhail Mikhailovich Cantacuzène had a distant cousin, Prince Grigorii L'vovich Kantakuzen (1843–1902), who was also a diplomat, serving as Russian representative to the U.S. from 1892 to 1895. But in 1893, Prince Mikhail was attached to the Russian embassy in Rome. In that context, he met Julia Dent Grant, first born grandchild of U.S. President Ulysses Simpson Grant, who was traveling in Europe with her maternal aunt, Bertha Palmer (née Honoré). Aunt and niece travelled throughout Europe to promote interest in the World's Columbian Exposition as well as to collect art. The couple married in the home of her aunt Bertha Palmer in Newport, Rhode Island, on 22 September 1899. Miss Grant assumed her husband's titles and was styled Julia Dent Cantacuzène Spiransky-Grant. Prince and Princess Cantacuzène resided in St. Petersburg (later Petrograd) or at their estate in Ukraine during their early married years, with the Princess giving birth to their three children:

- HH Prince Mikhail Mikhailovich Cantacuzène, Count Speransky (1900–1972), who married three times: firstly, to Clarissa Curtis, daughter of Thomas Pelham Curtis and Frances Kellogg Small; secondly, Florence Bushnell Carr; thirdly, Florence Clarke Hall.
- HH Princess Barbara "Bertha" Mikhailovna Cantacuzène, Countess Speransky (1904–1991), who married Bruce Smith. She married, secondly, William Durrell Siebern.
- HH Princess Zinaida Mikhailovna Cantacuzène, Countess Speransky (1908–1980), who married Sir John Coldbrook Hanbury-Williams, son of Major-General Sir John Hanbury-Williams and Annie Emily Reiss.

They divorced on 27 October 1934, after which Mrs. Julia Grant Cantacuzène, having re-established her U.S. citizenship and reverting to non-aristocratic title and style, moved back to her native Washington, D.C. while Prince Cantacuzène remained in Florida. He later married American Jeannette Draper of Sarasota. Prince Mikhail died on 25 March 1955 and was buried at the Manasota Memorial Park in Sarasota.

In Sarasota, he was involved in the American Legion, Elks, Kiwanis Club, County Fair Association, and Sarasota Chamber of Commerce.

=== Descendants ===
Through his son Prince Michael, he was a grandfather of one grandson and one granddaughter from his first marriage.

Through his daughter Princess Bertha, he was a grandfather of Bruce Michael Smith (1932–1982).

Through his daughter Princess Zinaida, he was a grandfather of one grandson and two granddaughters.
