= Betty Paoli =

Austrian writer (1814–1894)

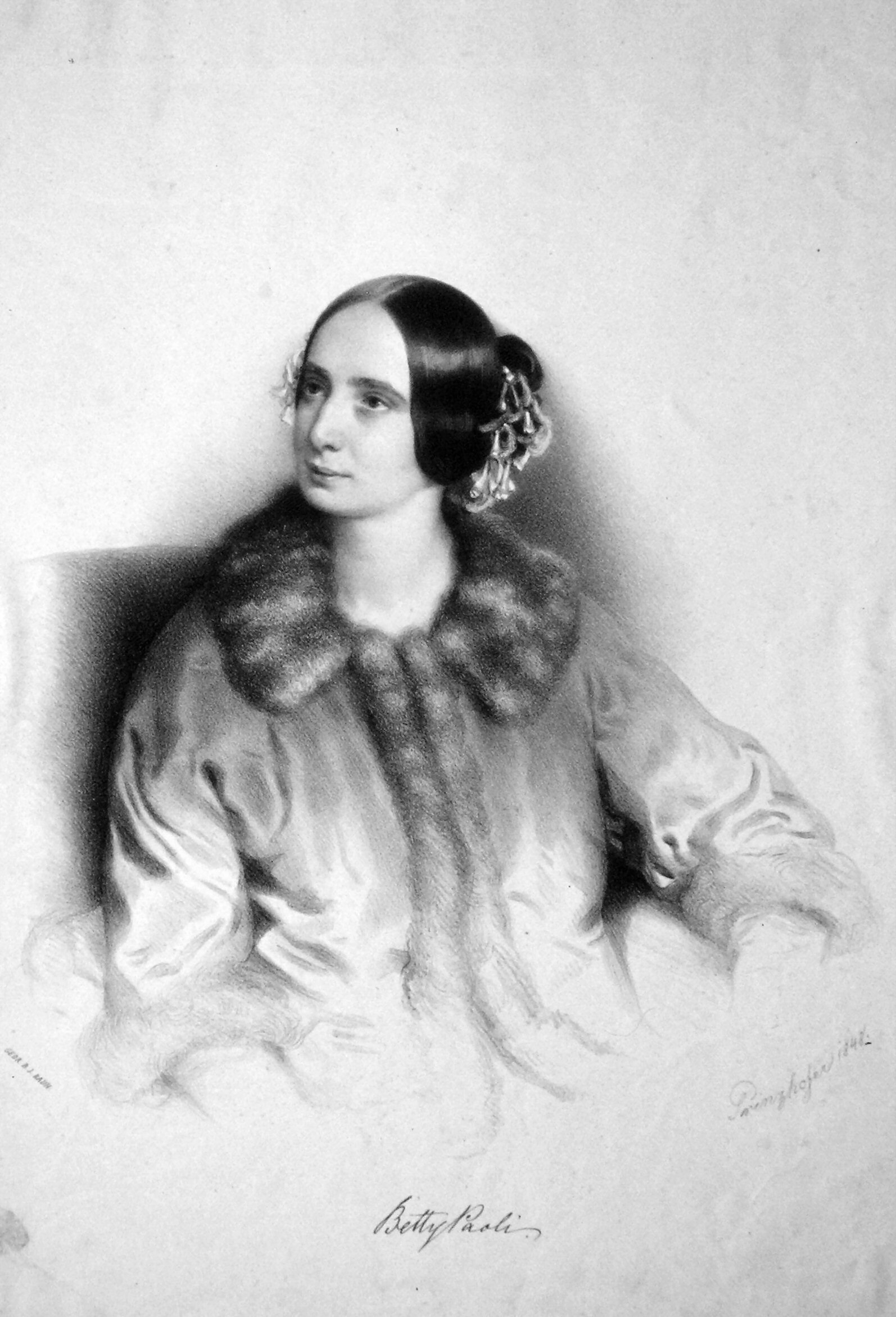
Paoli by August Prinzhofer (1847)

Betty Paoli (born Barbara Elisabeth Babette Glück; 30 December 1814 – 5 July 1894) was an Austrian writer, a companion of Princess Maria Anna Schwarzenberg (1767–1848) and friend of Maria von Ebner-Eschenbach. Paoli was a poet, journalist, translator, and art and theater critic.

== Early life ==
Barbara "Babette" Glück was born on 30 December 1814, in Vienna, Austria, to Theresia Glück, née Grünnagel, who had married seven months before to a high-ranking military doctor named Glück. Barbara was an unplanned pregnancy and her natural father was a prominent Hungarian nobleman. Theresia was soon widowed and left with a modest inheritance, which she frittered away. Mother and daughter frequently moved because of Theresia's erratic tendencies. Babette was largely self-educated, later describing her formation as à la diable ["haphazard; mixed up"], and became an avid reader. On her own for the first time after her mother had left her in Hungary with the family of a grammarian named Schmidt, she became proficient in English, French, and Italian. It was there she decided to earn her own living.

Babette worked as a seamstress to provide for herself and her mother until she accepted a position as governess across the border in Russian Poland. Sometime between 1830 and 1833, she left Vienna with her mother. In Poland Theresia became extremely homesick, begging Babette to leave her position, but she was unable to secure a release. Therefore, they absconded travelling back over the border to Austrian Galicia with a band of smugglers. Theresia fell ill from the journey and died in a Galician village.

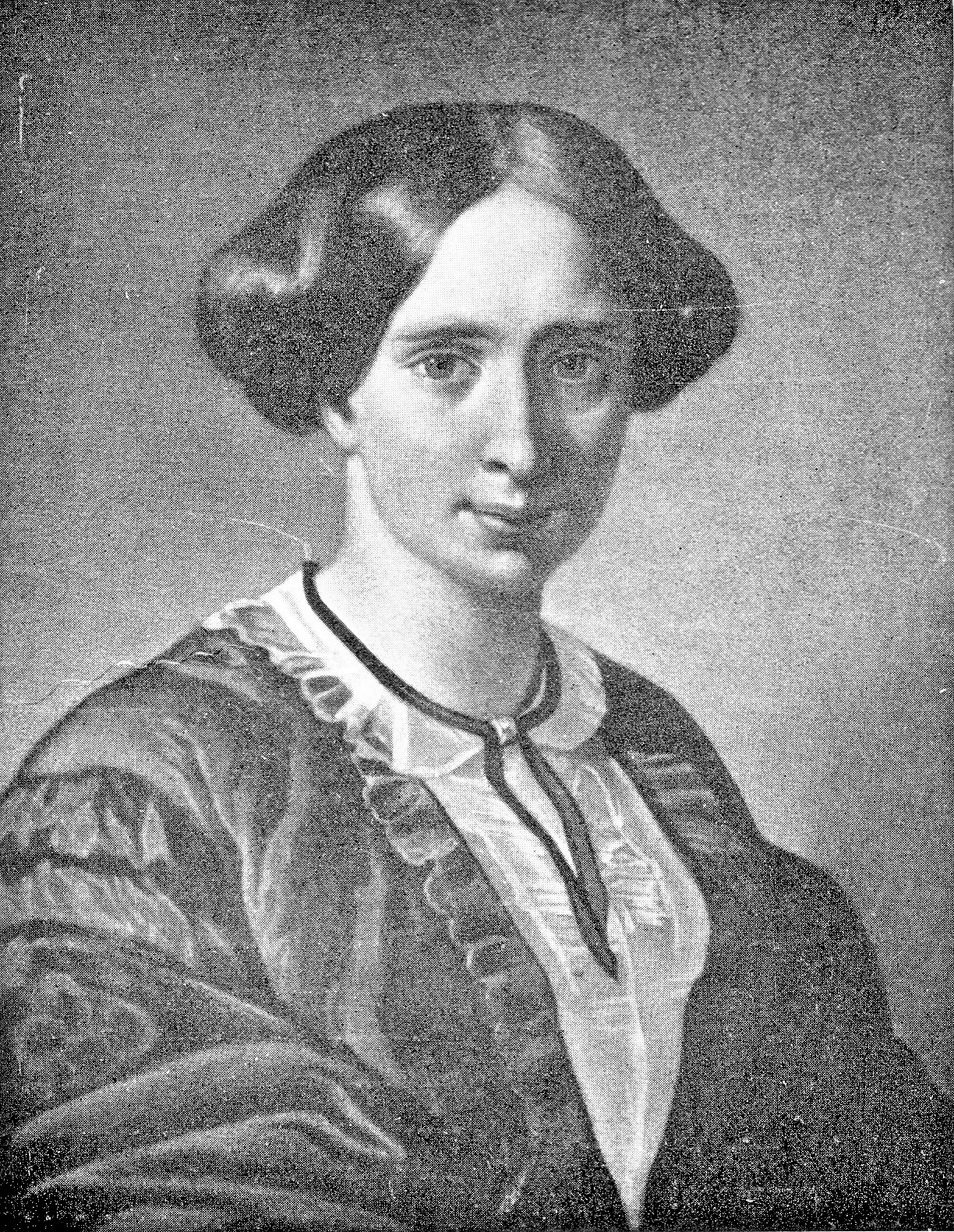
Portrait by Carl Rahl from before 1866

== Career ==
=== Becoming a writer ===
Babette Glück remained in Galicia as a governess to a family of Polish aristocrats. As time went on she felt demeaned and missed the freedom she had before becoming a governess. Her earliest poems date from her stay in Galicia, describing how poetry restored her hope and gave her courage to go on living. During the 1830s, she focused her poems on social issues; in An die Männer unserer Zeit ["To the Men of Our Time"], the 17-year-old offers a rebuttal to critics of women's emancipation, while Die Dichterin ["The Poetess"] told of her predicament in being deprived of a literary ancestry. Glück stayed in Galicia until she was 20, working to fill the gaps in her education. She studied in English and became acquainted with the works of Lord Byron. She returned to Vienna in the spring of 1835 where she first adopted the pseudonym "Paoli" for the publication of the short story Clary in Friedrich Witthauer's Wiener Zeitschrift. Her poems continued to appear in Moritz Gottlieb Saphir's Humorist and in Prague's leading journal, Ost und West until 1846. This, however, didn't give Paoli financial security. She worked as a tutor and a translator for her livelihood while continuing to write poems. In 1841, she published a small volume entitled Gedichte ["Poems"]. The popularity of her first book admitted Paoli into the salon of Henriette Wertheimer, wife of Viennese philanthropist Josef von Wertheimer. As Paoli's social life grew from becoming Wertheimer's companion, financial pressure also reduced. Through Wertheimer's social connections Paoli met Hieronymus Lorm, Franz Grillparzer, Leopold Kompert, and Ernst, Baron von Feuchtersleben. Paoli also met a source of her inspiration, Nikolaus Lenau. In 1843, she published her second collection of poems entitled Nach dem Gewitter ["After the Storm"]. The same year she became companion and reader to Princess Maria Anna Schwarzenberg, widow of Karl Philipp, Prince of Schwarzenberg. She remained her companion until Schwarzenberg's death in 1848.

In 1849, Paoli took a temporary post as companion to Countess Bünau in Dahlan near Dresden. During this time she took three months to visit France and worked as a freelance writer for the Neue Freie Presse to support herself. In France she met Heinrich Heine and George Sand. In January 1852, Paoli's first articles were printed in Eduard Warrens' Wiener Lloyd; as Warrens refused her a regular contract, she had to remain as a companion to Bünau. In 1854, Bünau's marriage to Count Sahr brought Paoli's position to an end, although the two remained close friends throughout their lives. Paoli traveled to Doblbad where a Russian writer, Elisabeth Bagréef-Speranski engaged her as a companion.

=== As an art and theater critic ===
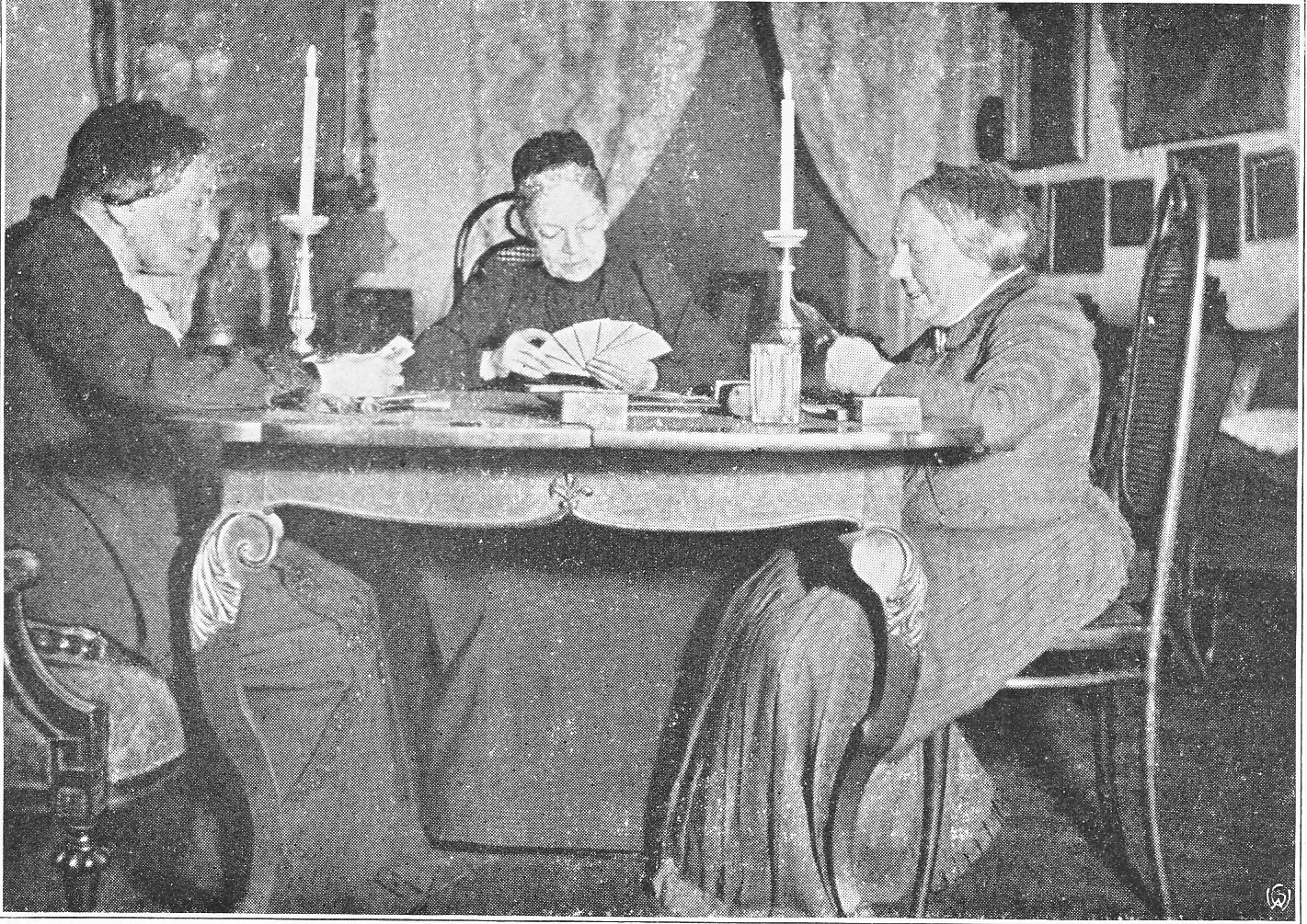
Paoli, Marie von Ebner-Eschenbach, and Ida von Fleischl-Marxow playing cards

In 1853, while also the companion of Madame Bagréef-Speranski, Paoli became a theater critic for the Hofburg, reviewing the monthly art exhibitions. She continued as a theater and art critic for the Österreichische Zeitung until 1860. Throughout this era she used another pseudonym – Branitz – to translate plays from French. Experience as a critic led Paoli to meet Carl von La Roche, Heinrich Anschütz, and Fanny Elßler. Paoli also boosted careers of actors, she introduced Josef Lewinsky to Otto Ludwig and helped Zerline and Ludwig Gabillon through difficult times. She remained very close to the Gabillons, and their daughter Helene wrote crucial information on Paoli that gives us insight into the life of the writer.

In 1855, Paoli moved in with Ida von Fleischl-Marxow. The Fleischl family was very close with Paoli and adopted her into the household. Paoli would remain with them until her death on 5 July 1894.

== Works ==
Paoli focused on women's issues, writing essays on her own experiences with misogyny to analyze broader social issues. In 1865, she published a report on the first women's congress in Leipzig. She also commonly inverted gender-specific metaphors for her poems.

Alfred Meissner admired Paoli's work. Moritz Hartmann described her as "brilliant" and "the only woman with whom I have ever been able to enjoy uninhibited conversation". Paoli's tone was simple and direct. She used sonnets primarily as her choice of poetic form.

== Publications ==
Betty Paoli's published works as cited by An Encyclopedia of Continental Women Writers.

- Gedichte [Poems] (1841)
- Nach dem Gewitter [After the Thunderstorm] (1843)
- Die Welt und mein Auge [The World and My Eye] (1844) 3 vols.
- Romancero (1845)
- Neve Gedichte [New Poems] (1850)
- Grillparzer und seine Werke [Grillparzer and His Works] (1875)
- Gedichte [Poems] (1895) posthumous selection, ed. Ebner-Eschenbach.
- Gesammelte Aufsätze [Collected Essays] (1908)
