= Patrick Ashley Cooper =

British businessman

Major Sir Patrick Ashley Cooper
- Sir Patrick in 1955
- Born: 18 November 1887; Aberdeen, Aberdeenshire, Scotland
- Died: 22 March 1961 (aged 73); At sea
- Education: Fettes College; Trinity Hall, Cambridge
- Occupation: Businessman
- Children: 4
- Military career
- Allegiance: United Kingdom
- Branch: British Army
- Service years: 1906–18
- Rank: Major
- Unit: Royal Field Artillery
- Conflicts: World War I

Major Sir Patrick Ashley Cooper (18 November 1887 – 22 March 1961) was a British businessman who for more than two decades was governor of the Hudson's Bay Company and director of the Bank of England. He served as High Sheriff of the County of London and as High Sheriff of Hertfordshire.

== Early life and education ==
Ashley Cooper was born in Aberdeen, the eldest son of Patrick Cooper, and Mary Cook of Ashley, Aberdeenshire. He was educated at Fettes College in Edinburgh before attending Trinity Hall, Cambridge, and Aberdeen University, studying law.

== Career ==
=== War service ===
In 1906, Ashley Cooper joined the Volunteer Corps. He was commissioned as a 2nd Lieutenant in the 1st Aberdeenshire division, 2nd Highland Brigade, of the Royal Field Artillery. In 1913, he joined the 7th London Brigade as a lieutenant.

During the First World War, Ashley Cooper served in France with the Royal Field Artillery. He was wounded in 1915 and twice mentioned in dispatches, and was promoted to Major. He later served as Assistant Deputy Director-General of the Trench Warfare Department and Assistant Controller for Gun Ammunition.

During the Second World War, Ashley Cooper served on the Supply Council and as Director-General of Finance and Contracts at the Ministry of Supply from 1939 to 1942. According to The Times, he put his experience to great use during the war:

Using his wide experience of company management and commercial finance and enlisting the services of able technical assistants he developed machinery to keep pace with, and to keep check on, the steady expansion of expenditure on Army supplies. Ashley Cooper visited hundreds of firms personally to seek complaints or give advice. To a ministry which had been set up only a short time before the war he brought qualities which were in special demand and those who worked with him and under him knew they could rely upon his support for bold rather than cautious decisions.

He was knighted in the 1944 New Year Honours for his wartime service.

=== Business career ===
After the First World War, he was engaged in financial and industrial reorganisation for some years, and, in 1931, he was appointed a member of the National Economy Committee.

From 1931 to 1952, Cooper was Governor (Company Chairman) of the Hudson's Bay Company, North America's oldest company (established by English royal charter in 1670). The company was struggling when he took over, and his obituary in The Times explains:

He was the thirtieth Governor of the Hudson's Bay Company, but the first in its 265 years' existence to sail to the company's northern posts, and to enter Hudson Bay by the historic fur trade route. He came to the company when its affairs were in the doldrums and it was some years before the thankless task of cutting out waste and overgrowth and strengthening the organization brought the company back to a profit-earning basis. But under his governorship its prosperity increased steadily and his resignation, which was announced immediately after his sixty-fifth birthday, was greatly regretted.

Ashley Cooper held a number of other positions at various organisations. He was a director of the Bank of England (1932–55), a member of the famed May Committee on National Expenditure (1931), a governor of Guy's Hospital (1926–53), was a member of the London Passenger Transport Board (1933–47), and a member of the Rhodesia-Nyasaland Royal Commission (1938).

Ashley Cooper was High Sheriff of the County of London (1944 and 1957) and of Hertfordshire in 1946.

== Personal life ==
He married Kathleen Spickett of Pontypridd, Glamorgan, and they adopted the surname of Ashley Cooper. They had one son and two daughters. They resided at Hexton Manor in Hexton, Hertfordshire. One of his daughters, Cynthia, married Conservative MP Paul Bryan.

He died at sea in 1961, aged 73.

Honorary titles
| Preceded by John Coldbrook Hanbury-Williams | High Sheriff of the County of London; 1944–1945 | Succeeded by Otto Niemeyer |
| Preceded by Sir Charles Jocelyn Hambro | High Sheriff of the County of London; 1957–1958 | Succeeded by John Coldbrook Hanbury-Williams |
| Preceded by Sir Humphrey de Trafford | High Sheriff of Hertfordshire; 1946–1947 | Succeeded by Francis Pawle |
