= Ida Marie Honoré =

American socialite (1854–1930)

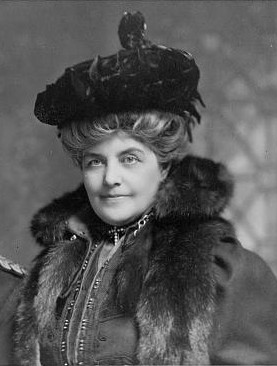
- Grant in 1905
- Born: Ida Marie Honoré; June 4, 1854; Louisville, Kentucky, U.S.
- Died: September 5, 1930 (aged 76); Washington, D.C., U.S.
- Education: St. Xavier School; Dearborn Seminary
- Alma mater: Georgetown Visitation Monastery
- Spouse: Frederick Dent Grant (m. 1874; died 1912)
- Children: Julia Dent Grant; Ulysses S. Grant III
- Parent: Henry Hamilton Honoré
- Relatives: Bertha "Cissie" Honoré Palmer (sister)

Ida Marie Honoré Grant (June 4, 1854 – September 5, 1930) was an American socialite, philanthropist, and ambassador's wife.

== Early life ==
Born Ida Marie Honoré in Louisville, Kentucky, her father was prominent Chicago businessman and leading real estate developer Henry Hamilton Honoré. Ida attended St. Xavier School and Dearborn Seminary in Chicago, and graduated from Georgetown Visitation Preparatory School (although she was an Episcopalian) in Washington, D.C., in 1874.

She achieved a reputation as a skilled musician on harp and piano.

== Personal life ==
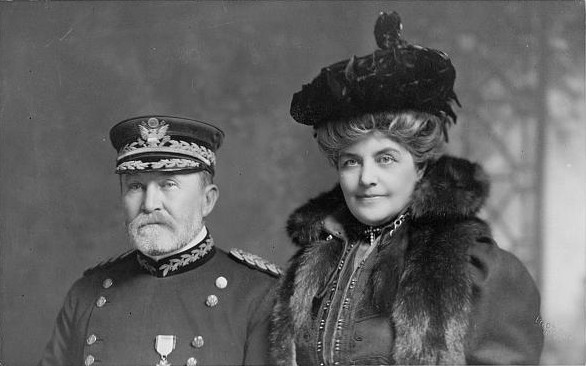
Honoré and her husband Frederick Dent Grant

During her time in Washington, D.C. she met and began to be courted by Frederick Dent Grant, oldest son of US President Ulysses S Grant. They eventually married in her parents' home on October 20, 1874, with the President and First Lady in attendance. She was twenty years of age. (Note: In the biography written about her sister, Bertha Palmer, entitled "Silhouette in Diamonds," the wedding feast was provided by Bertha's husband, Potter Palmer, and included stewed terrapin, escalloped oysters, sweetbread patties, turkey, snipe, chicken or lobster salad, boned quail in jelly, ices, charlotte russe, fresh fruits and frappéed champagne, port, and sherry.) Following a brief honeymoon, Ida left to live with her mother and father-in-law at the White House, while her husband Fred continued in military service. Together, Frederick and Ida Marie were the parents of two children:

- Julia Dent Grant (1876–1975)
- Ulysses III (1881–1968)

The birth of Ulysses III resulted in his mother's invalidism for an extended period of time and caused lifelong health issues.

=== Family travels ===
Her husband resigned from the Army in 1881, and assisted his father in preparing the latter's memoirs. During this time, he was in business in New York City. In 1889, then President Benjamin Harrison appointed Grant as the U.S. Minister to Austria-Hungary, during which time the entire family moved with him to Vienna. After Grover Cleveland became president, Grant was allowed to continue in his post and served until he resigned in 1893.

The following year, the family moved to New York, where Grant became a New York City Police Commissioner, a role he held until 1898.

Following the outbreak of the Spanish–American War in 1898, Grant enlisted and was appointed a colonel of the 14th New York Volunteers, and thereafter promoted to brigadier general of volunteers, serving in Puerto Rico. In 1899, Grant was sent to the Philippines for service in the Philippine–American War, where he remained until 1902, having been promoted to brigadier general in the Regular Army in 1901. As her children were by then adults, Ida traveled and accompanied Frederick during all of these assignments. When he returned to the United States, he held various commands and was promoted to major general in 1906.

Frederick died of cancer at Fort Jay on Governors Island in New York City on April 12, 1912, and was buried in West Point Cemetery. At the time of his death, he was the commander for the Eastern Division, which included the Department of the East and the Department of the Gulf.

=== Later life and death ===
Ida Marie Grant moved to The Acacias, Sarasota, Florida, joining her sister Bertha Palmer, who was in the process of developing Sarasota into a destination residence community. After her sister's death, Ida became the beneficiary of her estate and inherited both land and money, which enabled her to live an independent and comfortable life. She briefly moved to upstate New York to live with her son Ulysses III, who was teaching at Hamilton College in Clinton, New York.

Later, she moved to 1711 New Hampshire Avenue in Washington, D.C., where she died on September 5, 1930. She was buried with her husband in West Point Cemetery, New York. Her estate, valued at $373,000, was left to her family.
