= John Coldbrook Hanbury-Williams =

British businessman and courtier (1892–1965)

Sir John Hanbury-Williams CVO
- Sir John Coldbrook Hanbury-Williams in 1953
- Born: 28 May 1892; Henley-on-Thames, Oxfordshire, England
- Died: 10 October 1965 (aged 73); Westminster, London, England
- Occupations: businessman, banker
- Military career
- Allegiance: United Kingdom
- Branch: British Army
- Unit: 10th Royal Hussars
- Conflicts: World War I

Sir John Coldbrook Hanbury-Williams CVO (28 May 1892 – 10 August 1965) was a British businessman and courtier. He was director of Courtaulds from 1946 to 1962, served as a director of the Bank of England from 1936 to 1963, and held various positions in the royal household.

== Early life ==
Hanbury-Williams was born in Henley-on-Thames, the son of Major-General Sir John Hanbury-Williams and Annie Emily Reiss. He was educated at Wellington College.

He began his business career at Rice Bros. in London and Manchester, prior to the First World War breaking out. He served in France with the 10th Royal Hussars and also served at General Headquarters. He was wounded during the war and mentioned in despatches.

== Career ==
In 1926, Hanbury-Williams joined textile company Courtaulds in Coventry before being transferred to the company's headquarters in London. He concentrated on the company's yarn trade overseas and soon oversaw administration of Courtaulds' foreign-affiliated companies. In 1930, he was elected to the company's board of directors. In 1935, he was appointed a managing director, concentrating on the companies international trade. He was directly involved in the founding of British Cellophane.

In 1936, Hanbury-Williams was elected to the court of directors of the Bank of England, and served as a director until his retirement in February 1963. From 1940 to his retirement, he also served as a member of the Bank of England's Committee of Treasury.

Prior to the Second World War, Hanbury-Williams was responsible for Courtaulds involvement with nylon, invented in 1935 by DuPont. After the War began, he worked full-time as an executive director of the Bank of England in 1940–41. In 1942, he served under the Minister of Economic Warfare, Lord Selborne. In 1943, he returned to Courtaulds and was appointed deputy chairman. In 1946, he succeeded Samuel Courtauld as chairman of the company.

Courtaulds had suffered during the wartime years and had been forced to sell off its almost wholly owned American subsidiary, the American Viscose Corporation, for badly needed dollars for Great Britain. Post-war, the company also needed to replenish its staff across the board and underwent a period of major recruitment. A particular achievement for Hanbury-Williams was the return to the United States in 1951 with the establishment of a new American subsidiary, Courtaulds, Inc.

Additionally, Hanbury-Williams served as chairman of the Prime Minister's Committee on the ordering procedure for civil aircraft in 1948; honorary treasurer (and later a trustee) of the Commonwealth Study Conference at Oxford in 1956; president of the International Association for the Protection of Industrial Property in 1959–60; and a vice-president of the National Council for Social Service.

Hanbury-Williams was knighted in the 1950 New Year Honours, for public services.

== Courtier ==
Hanbury-Williams became a Gentleman Usher to George V in 1931, and served as Gentleman Usher to Edward VIII in 1936. Between 1936 and 1965 Hanbury-Williams held the office of Lieutenant of the City of London. He was Gentleman Usher to George VI between 1937 and 1946, and was Extra Gentleman Usher to the King between 1946 and 1952. He was invested as a Commander of the Royal Victorian Order in the 1956 New Year Honours.

From 1952 to 1965 he was Extra Gentleman Usher to Elizabeth II. Hanbury-Williams served as High Sheriff of the County of London twice; in 1943 and 1958.

== Personal life ==
Hanbury-Williams married Princess Zenaida Cantacuzène, daughter of Major-General Prince Mikhail Cantacuzène, 2nd Count Speransky and Julia Dent Grant, granddaughter of US President Ulysses S. Grant, on 1 November 1928 in Washington, D.C. They had one son and two daughters.

He died in 1965 at the London Clinic, aged 73.

Honorary titles
Preceded by Dallas Gerald Mercer Bernard	High Sheriff of the County of London; 1943–1944	Succeeded by Sir Patrick Ashley Cooper
Preceded by Sir Patrick Ashley Cooper	High Sheriff of the County of London; 1958–1959	Succeeded by Laurence John Cadbury
