= Frederick Tracy Dent =

United States Army officer (1820–1892)

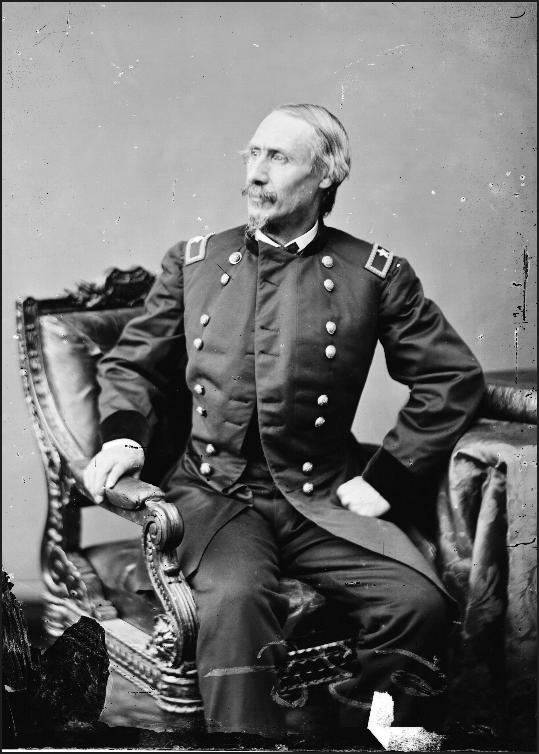

Personal details
- Born: December 17, 1820 White Haven, Missouri, U.S.
- Died: December 12, 1892 (aged 71) Denver, Colorado, U.S.
- Resting place: Arlington National Cemetery
- Spouse: Helen Louise Lynde
- Children: Margaret; John; Sidney
- Parents: Frederick Fayette Dent; Ellen Bray Wrenshall
- Relatives: Julia Grant (sister); Frederick Dent Grant (nephew)
- Education: United States Military Academy Class of 1843

Military service
- Branch/service: US Army
- Years of service: 1846-1881
- Rank: Brigadier General
- Unit: 6th US Infantry; 4th US Infantry
- Battles/wars: Mexican-American War; Yakima War; American Civil War

Frederick Tracy Dent (December 17, 1820 – December 23, 1892) was an American general.

== Early life ==
Dent was born on December 17, 1820, in White Haven, St. Louis County, Missouri. He was the son of Frederick Fayette Dent (1787–1873) and Ellen Bray (née Wrenshall) Dent (1793–1857).

He graduated from West Point in 1843. One of Dent's classmates was Ulysses S. Grant, who married Dent's sister Julia. Ulysses and Julia Grant named their first son, Frederick Dent Grant, after him.

== Career ==
Dent was assigned as brevet second lieutenant to the 6th US Infantry, served in the Southern campaign during the Mexican–American War, and was brevetted first lieutenant and captain for gallant and meritorious conduct at Contreras, Churubusco and at Molino del Rey respectively.

He served for 16 years on frontier duty, taking part in the Yakima War, and in March 1863 was promoted to major in the 4th US Infantry and was stationed in New York City to suppress anticipated riots. In March 1864, he was promoted to lieutenant colonel and became aide-de-camp to General Grant.

On April 5, 1865, President Abraham Lincoln appointed Dent brigadier general of volunteers to rank from April 5, 1865, but the President did not submit the nomination to the U.S. Senate before his death ten days later, so Dent's appointment was not immediately confirmed.Eventually, President Andrew Johnson submitted the nomination on January 13, 1866, and the U.S. Senate confirmed it on February 23, 1866. Dent was mustered out of the Union Army volunteer force on April 30, 1866.

On July 17, 1866, President Andrew Johnson nominated Dent for appointment to the brevet grade of brigadier general in the Regular United States Army, and the U.S. Senate confirmed the appointment on July 23, 1866. From 1869 to 1873 he served as a military secretary to President Grant. He commanded Fort Trumbull, in Connecticut, in 1875 and the post of St. Augustine in 1881.

He retired in 1883 and lived first in Washington, D.C., and later in Denver, Colorado, where one of his sons practiced law.

== Personal life ==
Dent was married to Helen Louise Lynde (1836–1922). Together, they were the parents of:

- Margaret Lynde Dent (1854–1921), who married Lafayette E. Campbell (1845–1919).
- John Cromwell Dent (1857–1933)
- Sidney H. Dent (1861–1933)

He died in Denver on December 23, 1892, and was buried at Arlington National Cemetery.

== See also ==
- Bibliography of Ulysses S. Grant
