= Julia Grant Cantacuzène =

American-born Russian noble and writer (1876–1975)

Julia Dent Grant
- Princess Cantacuzène; Countess Speransky
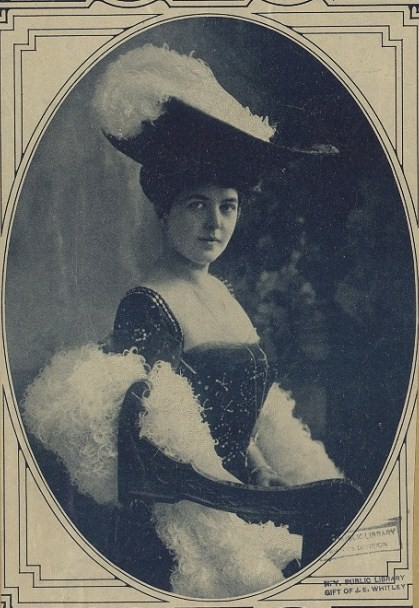
- Born: Julia Dent Grant; June 6, 1876; White House, Washington, D.C., U.S.
- Died: October 4, 1975 (aged 99); Washington, D.C., U.S.
- Noble family: Grant family (by birth); Cantacuzino (by marriage)
- Spouse: Prince Mikhail Cantacuzène, Count Speransky (m. 1899; div. 1934)
- Issue: Prince Michael Mikhailovich Cantacuzène; Princess Bertha Mikhailovna; Princess Zenaida Mikhailovna
- Father: Frederick Dent Grant
- Mother: Ida Marie Honoré

Princess Julia Dent Grant Cantacuzène, Countess Speransky (June 6, 1876 – October 4, 1975), was an American author and historian. She was the eldest child of Frederick Dent Grant and his wife Ida Marie Honoré, and the second grandchild of Ulysses S. Grant, the 18th President of the United States. In 1899, she married Prince Mikhail Cantacuzène, a Russian imperial general and diplomat.

Princess Cantacuzène was the author of three first-person accounts of the events leading up to the Russian Revolution in 1917, as well as a personal historian of the Russian people during that time. As the wife of a Russian nobleman, she was in a primary position to observe both the Imperial and Bolshevik positions during the Revolution. The title of Countess Speransky has been alternatively transcribed from its original Cyrillic (Спера́нский) as "Spéransky" and "Spiranski."

== Early life ==
Julia Dent Grant was born at the White House on 6 June 1876. She was the first child of Frederick Dent Grant and Ida Marie Honoré, the daughter of Henry Honoré, of French ancestry, who made his fortune in Chicago real estate. She was named for her grandmother, the First Lady Julia Grant (née Dent). At the time of her birth, her father was assigned to the 4th U.S. Cavalry Regiment with the rank of lieutenant colonel. When Julia was five years old, her father took a leave of absence from the Army to assist his father, the former president Grant, in writing his memoirs.

Julia had fond memories of her grandfather, who died when she was nine years old. Due to severe financial setbacks, her family came to live with her grandparents in Long Branch, New Jersey and she spent the last year (1884–1885) of her grandfather's life in his home with his companionship. Her memories of him were clearly fond ones, as she remembered the following:

My grandfather wasn't exactly gay, and I do not remember his laughing ever, but the talk between us was very interesting. He always took me seriously. I felt promoted and felt inclined to live up my position as his companion. Sometimes he would pinch my ear or my cheek and say softly, 'Julianna Johnson, don't you cry," and it rather teased me. But generally he held my pudgy dimpled hand on the palm of his, and we learned to count the fingers and dimples together; sometimes I made a mistake and sometimes he did so, letting me correct him. And he taught me "cat's cradle" with a string. We walked together hand in hand, silent frequently, but at other moments talking of our surroundings, and he called me habitually "my pet," or "my big pet," which made me very proud. I was not at all afraid of him, for he had a charming, gentle way of acting always, and though his face was generally grave, now and then a sudden gleam lighted up the eyes and made them seem to smile in answer to my chatter.

In 1889, President Benjamin Harrison appointed Julia's father as United States minister to Austria-Hungary. The Grant family traveled together to Austria-Hungary. After Grover Cleveland became president, Grant was confirmed to continue in his post in Europe. Julia made her formal début into society in Vienna, at the court of Empress Elisabeth of Austria. Frederick Dent Grant resigned his position as US ambassador in 1893, whereupon the family returned to New York.

== Marriage and family ==
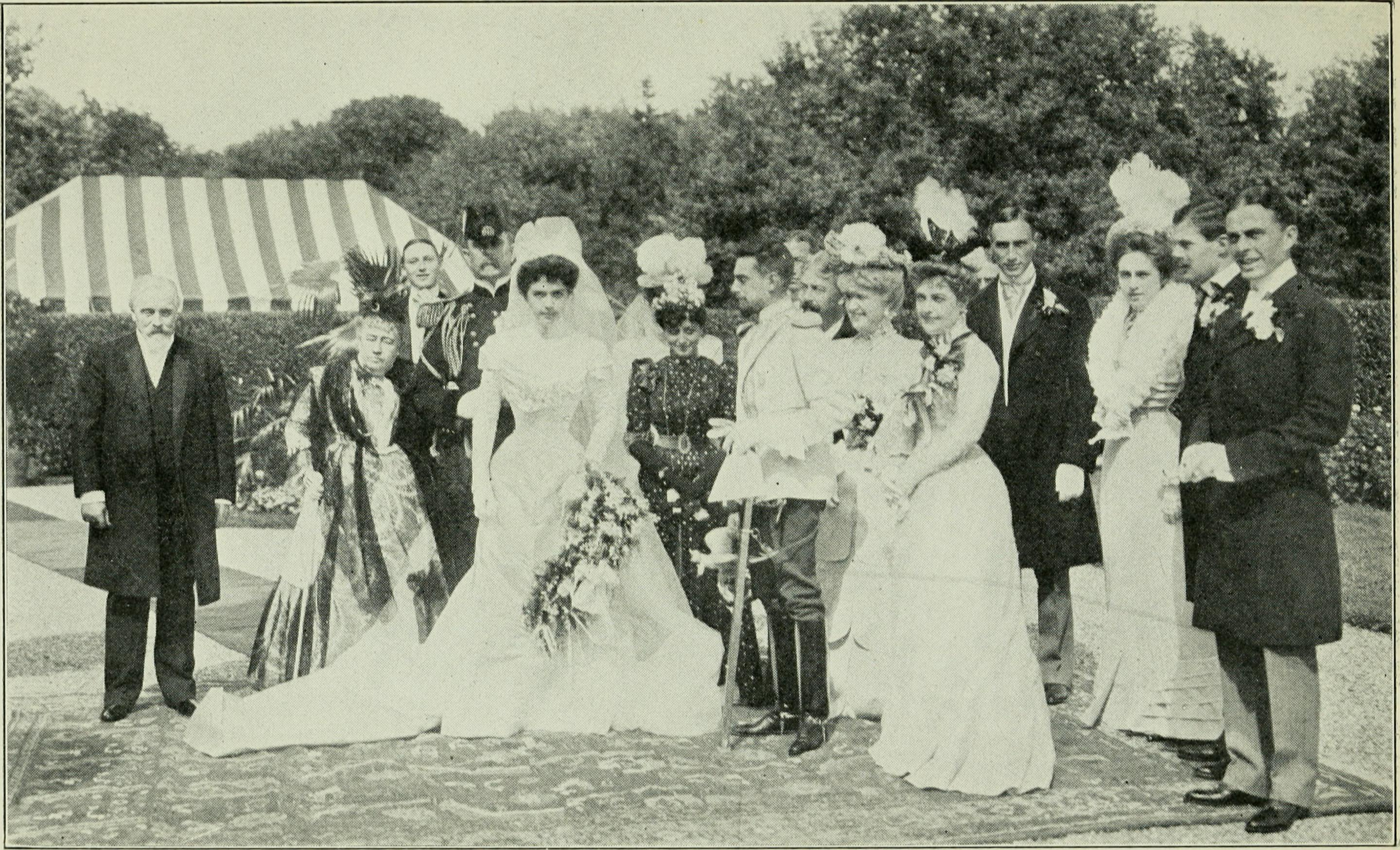
Part of the Cantacuzene Wedding Party in Newport

Immediately after her father's tenure (1883–1887) as a police commissioner of the New York Police Department, Julia Dent Grant traveled to Europe in the company of her maternal aunt, Bertha Palmer (née Honoré) who was representing the Board of Lady Managers of the World's Columbian Exposition (Chicago World's Fair.) From 1891 to 1893, aunt and niece travelled throughout Europe to promote interest in the Exposition as well as to collect art. Julia met Prince Mikhail Cantacuzène, who was attached to the Russian embassy in Rome. Prince Michael (or Mikhail) was Prince Mikhail Mikhailovich Cantacuzène, son of Prince Mikhail Rodionovich Cantacuzène and Elizabeth Siscard, was born on 29 April 1875 in Odessa, Russia. He was a distant relative of Grigorii L'vovich Kantakuzen, who was the Russian representative to the U.S. from 1892 to 1895. Two weeks after their first meeting in Rome, Prince Cantacuzène followed Julia to Cannes, ostensibly to serve under Grand Duke Kyrill. After a courtship of two days, the couple became engaged in Cannes, and were married in Newport, Rhode Island, in a Russian Orthodox ceremony the evening of 24 September 1899. The following day at noon there was an Episcopal Church wedding service in All Saints' Memorial Chapel, Newport.

They resided in St. Petersburg (later Petrograd) or at their estate in Ukraine during their early married years, and had three children. She remained in St. Petersburg during World War I in which Prince Cantacuzène served as aide-de-camp and later Major-General, and finally General, in the service of Tsar Nicholas II. He was wounded during the Battle of Galicia in 1914; as commander of the South Russia Cossacks, in 1915 he led 15,000 men in what has been called the last great cavalry charge against a fortified position in military history. The family left Russia in the aftermath of the Russian Revolution; in 1917, they escaped from Petrograd with her jewels sewn into her clothing, and escaped via Finland to the United States. The couple relocated to Sarasota, Florida, joining the firm founded by her aunt Bertha Palmer.

The Cantacuzènes divorced on 27 October 1934.

== Writing career ==
Cantacuzène was the author of articles which appeared in The New York Times, The Saturday Evening Post, and Woman's Home Companion. Her books included, Russian People; Revolutionary Recollections, (1919) Revolutionary Days; Recollections of Romanoffs and Bolsheviki, 1914–1917, (1920) and My Life Here and There. (1922) All of her books were published in the U.S. by Charles Scribner's Sons, and in London by the firm of Chapman & Hall.

== Later life ==
She was a founder of the Sulgrave Club. She was also a member of the Daughters of the American Revolution.She went blind before she turned 80 years old, and regained partial eyesight two weeks before she turned 90. She died in Washington on October 4, 1975, at the age of 99, and is buried at the National Cathedral.

== Books ==
- Revolutionary Days: Recollections of Romanoffs and Bolsheviki, 1914-1917, published 1919, Charles Scribner's Sons
- Russian People, Revolutionary Recollections, published 1920, Charles Scribner's Sons
- My Life Here and There, published 1922, Charles Scribner's Sons

== Ancestry ==
Ancestors of Julia Grant Cantacuzène

16. Captain Noah Grant
8. Jesse Root Grant
17. Rachel Kelly
4. President Ulysses S. Grant
18. John Simpson
9. Hannah Simpson
2. Frederick Dent Grant
20. George Dent
10. Colonel Frederick Fayette Dent
21. Susannah Marbury Dawson
5. Julia Boggs Dent
22. John Wrenshall
11. Ellen Bray Wrenshall
23. Mary Bennington
1. Julia Dent Cantacuzène Spéransky-Grant, Princess Cantacuzène and Countess Spéransky
24. Jean Antoine Honore
12. Francis Honoré
6. Henry Hamilton Honoré
13. Matilda Lockwood
3. Ida Marie Honoré
14. Captain John Carr
7. Eliza J. Carr
30. Edward D'Arcy
15. Mary Dorsey
31. Sarah Wyatt
