= John Hanbury-Williams =

British Army general (1859–1946)

Major-General Sir John Hanbury-Williams GCVO KCB CMG
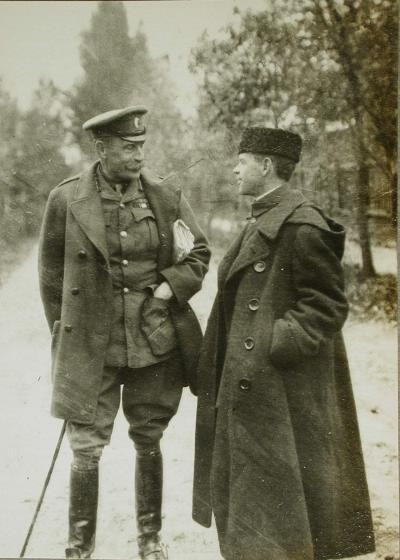
- Hanbury-Williams (left) with The Times correspondent Stanley Washburn, Russia, October 1914
- Born: 19 October 1859
- Died: 19 October 1946 (aged 87)
- Military career
- Allegiance: United Kingdom
- Branch: British Army
- Service years: 1878–1919
- Rank: Major-General
- Unit: 43rd Light Infantry
- Conflicts: Anglo-Egyptian War; Second Boer War; First World War
- Awards: Knight Grand Cross of the Royal Victorian Order; Knight Commander of the Order of the Bath; Companion of the Order of St Michael and St George; Mentioned in Dispatches

Major-General Sir John Hanbury-Williams, GCVO, KCB, CMG (19 October 1859 – 19 October 1946) was a British Army officer, who served as Military Secretary to the Secretary of State for War and later Brigadier-General in charge of Administration (Scotland). He served on the International Olympic Committee (IOC), representing Canada between 1911 and 1921. During the First World War he was head of the British military mission with the Russian Stavka with direct access to Tsar Nicholas II.

== Early life ==
John Hanbury-Williams was the youngest son of Ferdinand Hanbury-Williams, of Coldbrook Park, Monmouthshire. He was educated at Wellington College.

== Military career ==
Hanbury-Williams attended the Royal Military College, Sandhurst, and in 1878 he was commissioned as a second lieutenant into the 35th Regiment of Foot, later the Royal Sussex Regiment, before transferring to the 43rd Light Infantry. He was ADC to Lieutenant General Sir E. Hamley in the Anglo-Egyptian War of 1882. That same year he took part in the Battle of Tel-El-Kebir, and was mentioned in despatches. He was extra ADC to Sir M. E. Grant Duff, Governor of Madras in 1884 and 1885. Hanbury-Williams, promoted in December 1886 to captain, (although this was later antedated to September) was adjutant of the 3rd Oxfordshire Light Infantry from 1892 to 1897.

He served in the Second Boer War between 1899 and 1900 and was mentioned in despatches. He was Military Secretary to Sir Alfred Milner from 1897 to 1900 and Military Secretary to the Secretary of State for War from 1900 to 1903. He was promoted on 10 February 1904 to brevet colonel and was the Canadian Governor-General's Secretary and Military Secretary from 1904 to 1909. On 1 December 1909 he was promoted to colonel and then promoted to temporary brigadier general in charge of administration (Scotland), holding this post until 1914. In 1911 he was elected as a member of the International Olympic Committee (IOC) to represent Canada and served on the IOC until 1921. He was promoted to major general on 10 July 1912 and was employed on the British General Staff in 1914.

During the First World War he was head of the British military mission with the Russian Stavka and was mentioned in despatches. He was popular with the Russian leaders because he was a relative of Charles Hanbury Williams. David Lloyd George later recorded in his War Memoirs (published in the 1930s) that he was charming, hardworking and able to point out faults without causing offence. However, historian George Cassar writes that he had little knowledge of Eastern Europe and could not speak Russian, so had to converse with Russian generals in French; he had only limited dealings with his French counterpart General de Laguiche. He also had only limited dealings with the British Military Attache Lt-Col Alfred Knox (who had been in Russia since 1911 and was jealous of Hanbury Williams’ job), nor with Knox's assistant Captain James Blair – both of these men could speak Russian, and Knox often toured the Russian Army while Blair remained in Petrograd.

This post provided Hanbury-Williams with direct access to the Tsar. He later wrote a book titled The Emperor Nicholas II, as I knew him, published in 1922. He was in charge of the British Prisoners of War Department at The Hague from August 1917 to March 1918 and at Bern from April 1918 to December 1918. He retired from the army in August 1919.

He was His Majesty's Marshal of the Diplomatic Corps in the Royal Household of the Sovereign of England from 1920 to 1934. Hanbury-Williams was Colonel Commandant of the Oxfordshire and Buckinghamshire Light Infantry from 1918 to the time of his death when he was succeeded in the post by General Sir Bernard Paget. He was Extra Equerry to the King from 1934.

Hanbury-Williams was appointed a Companion of the Order of St Michael and St George (CMG) in the 1899 New Year Honours, and a Knight Commander of the Order of the Bath (KCB) in 1917. In the Royal Victorian Order, he was appointed a Commander (CVO) in the November 1902 Birthday Honours list, advanced to Knight Commander (KCVO) in 1908 on the occasion of the Prince of Wales' visit to Quebec, and advanced to Knight Grand Cross (GCVO) in 1926.

He was awarded the Order of St Vladimir, 3rd class with Swords, in 1915, and the Order of St Anne , first class with swords, in 1917.

== Personal life ==
John Hanbury-Williams married Annie Emily, youngest daughter of Emil Reiss, in 1888, with whom he was to have four children. His wife pre-deceased him in 1933.

Partly as a result of what he had seen at first hand in Russia during the First World War, Hanbury-Williams became a fierce opponent of Bolshevism, and was a founding member of the Liberty League which was formed in the United Kingdom after the war with a view to combat the spread of this political creed.

In 1934 he appeared as a witness in Princess Irina Alexandrovna of Russia's famous and successful libel suit against Metro-Goldwyn-Mayer Pictures Limited following the release in England of the film Rasputin, the Mad Monk (USA title: Rasputin and the Empress).

In later life Sir John Hanbury-Williams resided in an apartment in the Henry III Tower at Windsor Castle, where he died on 19 October 1946, on his eighty-seventh birthday. His oldest son was Sir John Coldbrook Hanbury-Williams (1892–1965), while another of his sons, Lt Charles Ferdinand Reiss Hanbury-Williams was killed in 1916 whilst serving with the Oxfordshire and Buckinghamshire Light Infantry.

== Books ==
- Cassar, George (2004). Kitchener's War: British Strategy from 1914-1916. Potomac Books. ISBN 1-574-88709-2.
