= Canney =

Canney is a surname. Some notable persons with the surname include:

- Don Canney (1930–2011), American politician and civil engineer
- Marian Canney (1921–2019), American academic
- Richard Canney (1852–1887), English-born cricketer and doctor in New Zealand and Australia
- Seán Canney (born 1960), Irish politician
