= Mercein =

Mercein is a surname. Notable people with the surname include:

- Chuck Mercein (born 1943), American football player
- Eleanor Mercein Kelly (1880–1968), American writer
