= Alonzo Myron Kimball =

American artist (1874–1923)

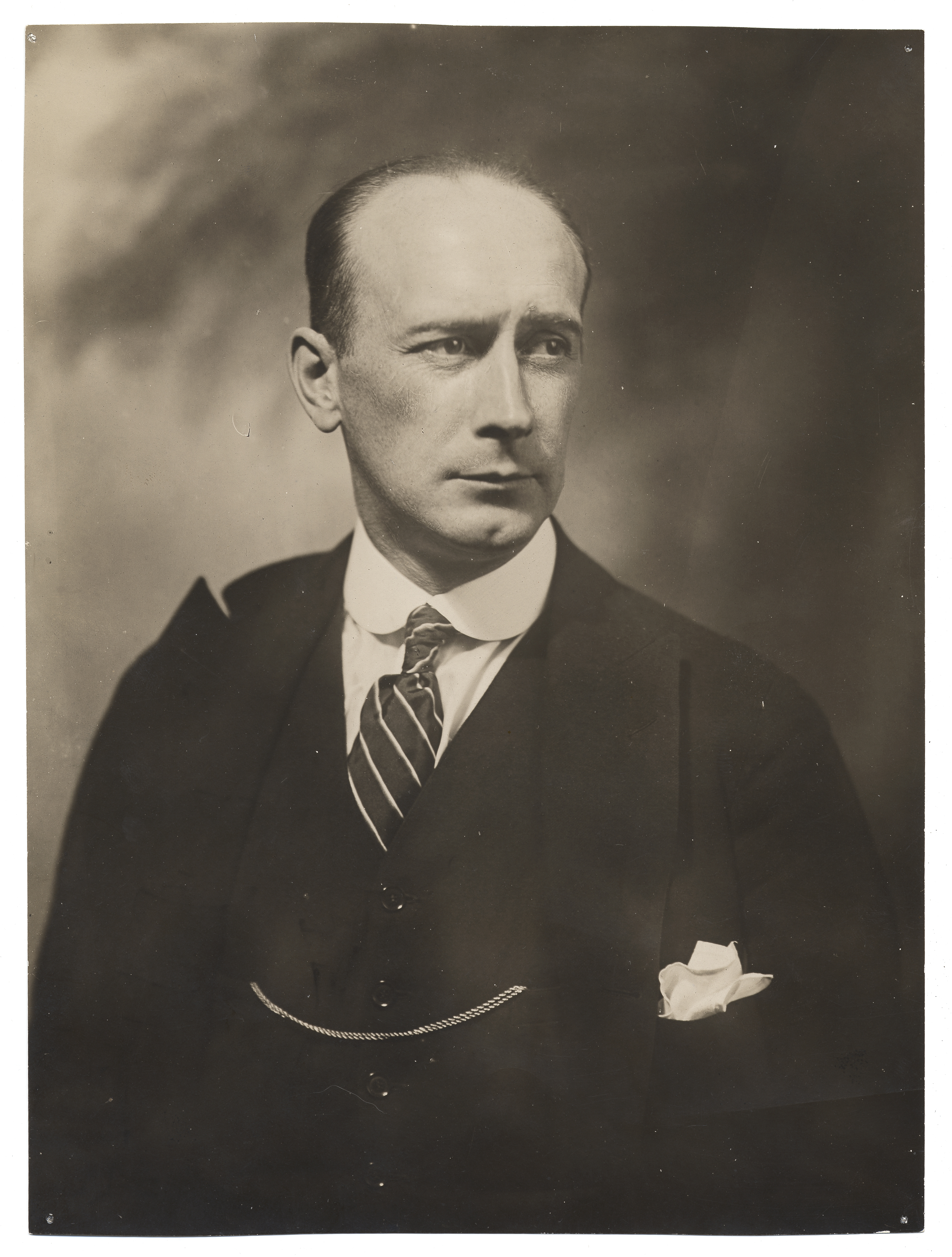
- Kimball, c. 1920
- Born: August 14, 1874; Green Bay, Wisconsin; United States
- Died: August 27, 1923 (aged 49); Evanston, Illinois; United States
- Occupations: Portrait painter, illustrator
- Years active: 1894–1923
- Spouses: Madeleine "Medley" Williams (m. 1902–his death)
- Children: 1, son Alonzo Weston Kimball (1905–1977)

Alonzo Myron Kimball (August 14, 1874 – August 27, 1923) was an American portrait artist and illustrator. A native of Wisconsin, Kimball received his art training in Chicago, New York, and Paris. Early in his career he specialized in portraiture, especially paintings of female subjects, but during the first decade of the 20th century he also became one of the leading book illustrators in the United States as well a cover artist for national periodicals such as Scribner's Magazine, Collier's, and The Saturday Evening Post. After 1914, Kimball began applying his talents increasingly to commercial advertising, which included designing theatrical posters for the film company Pathé and illustrating newspaper and magazine promotions for a variety of products.

== Early life and art training ==
Born in 1874 in Green Bay, Wisconsin, Alonzo was the younger of two sons of Myra Barnes (née Mahan) and Alonzo Weston Kimball, a native of Massachusetts, who later became a very successful, highly paid insurance executive in Chicago. (Note: Alonzo and his older brother, Theodore Mahan Kimball, and their half-sister, Marjorie Weston Kimball, grew up in an affluent household. Their grandfather, Alonzo Kimball (1808–1900), was the mayor of Green Bay, Wisconsin in 1871 and 1873. It was there where the siblings' father, Alonzo Weston Kimball, began his career in insurance as a district agent for Wisconsin. His success in that occupation during the late 1860s and 1870s led to his move with the family to Chicago after 1880. There he established Kimball & Norton, the region's leading agency for the Northwestern Mutual Life Insurance Company.) In 1882, when Alonzo was only eight years old, his mother died. Two years later his father married Ella Celestia Peak of Otsego, New York, and they resided in Evanston, Illinois, located a short distance north of downtown Chicago.

Alonzo demonstrated a keen interest and ability in art as a child. Later, during the early 1890s, he studied drawing and painting at the Art Students League of New York in Manhattan, and in 1894 he traveled to Europe to study with several renown artists. In France, Kimball trained with Jules Lefebvre at the Académie Julian in Paris, with Gustave Courtois, and in 1899 he exhibited at the Salon at the Académie des Beaux-Arts. He was also greatly influenced by the work of fellow American artist James McNeil Whistler. That influence was likely gained in Paris as well, at the Académie Carmen, an art school that Whistler founded in the French capital in 1898 and operated there until the facility's closure in 1901.

== Career ==
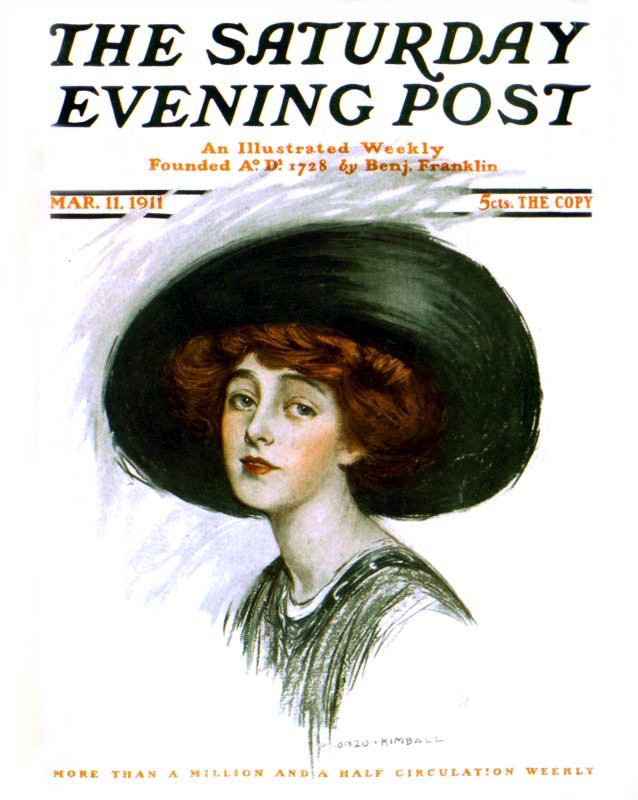
One of eight covers Kimball produced for The Saturday Evening Post between 1907 and 1911

In 1902, after returning to the United States from Europe, Kimball married and he and his wife Madeleine lived briefly in Evanston before they relocated to New York City. (Note: According to the Annual Art Annual: 1903-1904, edited by Florence N. Levy and published in 1903 (Part II—42), Alonzo Kimball is listed as a painter and living [1902-1903] at 502 Lake Street in Evanston, Illinois.) There he established himself professionally, quickly gaining a reputation for excellence in portraiture, especially for his oil paintings, watercolors, and pastels of female subjects or "American Beauties". He was commissioned for such works by both private and corporate clients, including major publishers. While still continuing his portrait work, Kimball also became one of the nation's leading illustrators during the first two decades of the twentieth century. Between 1903 and his death in 1923, he illustrated books for many of the nation's top writers. He also produced eight front covers for Saturday Evening Post as well covers and illustrations for assorted short stories and articles in other widely read weeklies and monthlies in the United States. Among those periodicals are Scribner's Magazine, Cosmopolitan, Holland's, Collier's, Metropolitan, Judge, The Ladies Home Journal, and "Sunday Magazine", which was a regular syndicated supplement to Sunday editions of The Boston Post, the New-York Tribune, Chicago Tribune, and various other newspapers across the country in the early 1900s. (Note: One of Kimball's covers for the "Sunday Magazine" for the March 17, 1912 issue of The Boston Post can be viewed at the Internet Archive. To see additional examples of Kimball's covers for other magazines, refer to the December 1911 issue of Cosmopolitan at HathiTrust and to the June 1913 issue of Holland's at the Internet Archive.)

=== Paintings and illustrations ===
Kimball's artwork exhibited unique qualities according to some reviewers of his paintings and drawings in the early 1900s. In a profile of him in the archives of The Saturday Evening Post, comments about those qualities in 1905 by art critic H. E. Bane are quoted:

Even in magazine illustrations he goes deep beneath the mask of features. In his work laughter is something more than a turning up of the corners of the mouth; manliness is more than a gray eye and a square chin; beauty is more than a perfect contour.

Kimball produced his original works either on canvas with oils or on illustration boards with varying combinations of charcoal, soft and hard pastels, gouache, and transparent watercolors. In a 1914 newspaper interview, he shared a few details about the "recipe" of procedures and techniques he used to achieve the distinctive, idealized appearance of the subjects in his portraits. For one, he stated, "'I first place my model in every possible light until I find the one most becoming to her, and I leave out the little shadows about the eyes and mouth, which may be there because she's tired.'" He then outlined other refinements he makes in a portrait's development, such as enlarging the subject's eyes, defining the mouth, and adding important highlights. "'High-lights'", he explained, "'that trickle down the face in a broken line striking the eyelids, the eyeballs, the corners of the eyes, a tiny speck on the lower lid, one on the teeth and one on the lips, give a look of perfect health.'"

Despite his increasing freelance work in commercial art after 1905, Kimball continued to accept portrait commissions from private clients and to exhibit periodically in museums, galleries, and salons. In the spring of 1910 he traveled once again to Paris to submit personally two of his paintings for consideration by the Salon. His works then, as in 1899, were accepted for exhibition. Both 1910 paintings were portraits. One depicted his wife; the other, Madame Marguerite Lemon, who was identified as "formerly of the Metropolitan Opera Company". News writer and art critic Kathrine Douglas commented on Kimball's paintings while covering the annual art exhibitions in the French capital. In a feature titled "Americans in Paris Salons", which was published in The Detroit Free Press on May 8, 1910, Douglas describes the painting of Madame Lemon, noting that "She wears a gorgeous Persian costume and is in a dancing pose—a filmy scarf falling from her raised arm." Douglas also comments on Kimball's presence in Paris at that time: "This artist has devoted all his attention to illustrating of late years and has now settled in Paris with the intention of spending most of his time painting." (Note: Kimball's travel to France and stay in Paris in 1910 explains why he and his family are not found in the United States census for that year.) Another example of Kimball's continuing interest in participating in public displays is his submission of illustrations in 1912 to the John Herron Art Institute for an exhibition in Indianapolis, Indiana. The institute accepted two of his works for the event held in March and April that year, an event devoted exclusively to showcasing the "Original Work by American Illustrators".

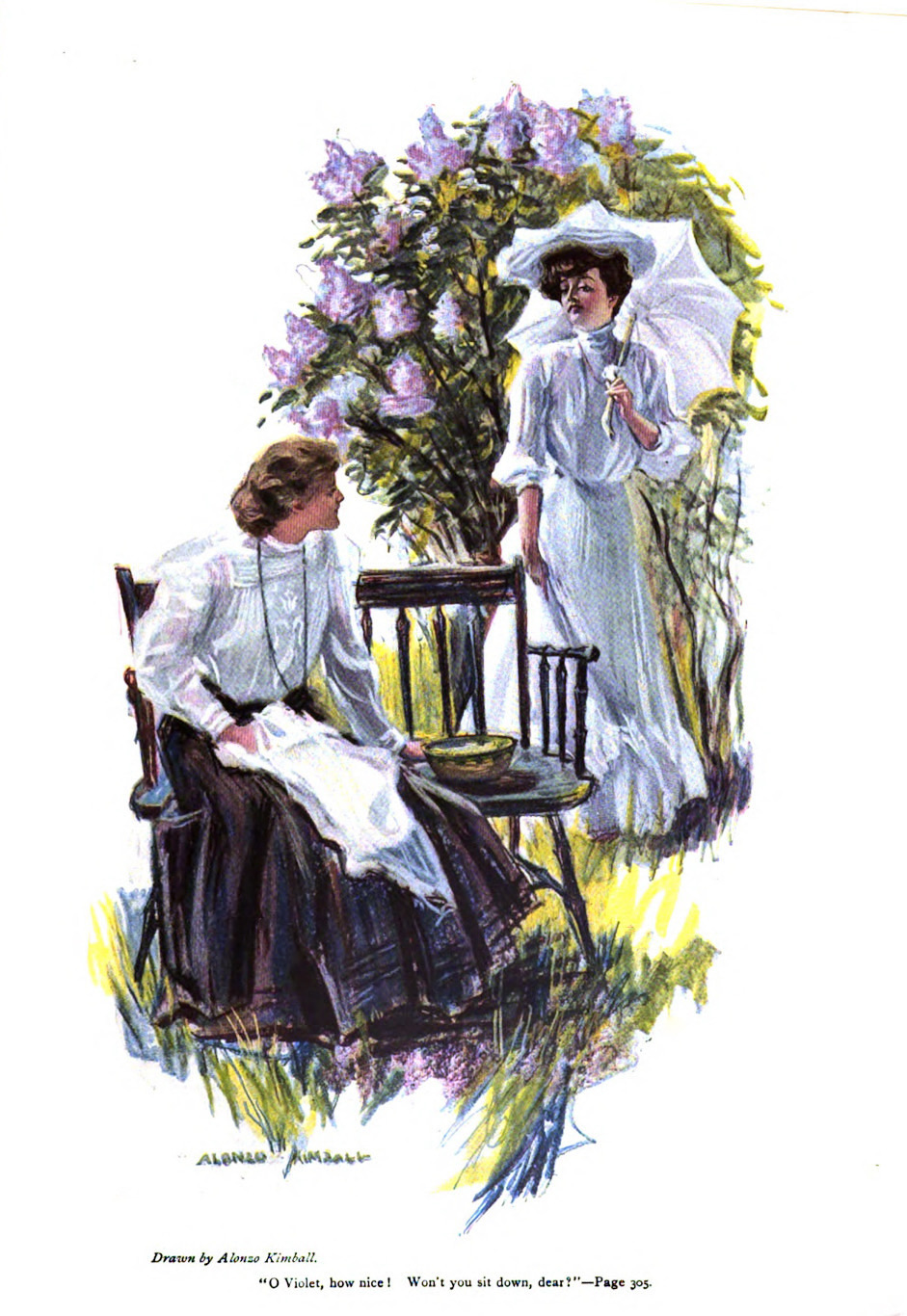
Kimball's illustration in the short story "Pattie" by Margaret Doane Gardiner, 1905

Kimball's portfolio of illustrations is extensive. A sampling of his pictures, which printers reproduced by photogravure or lithographic processes, provides some perspective on the style and diversity of artwork he furnished to publishers and to writers, many of whom were female authors. Some examples of his illustrations can be found in the short story "Pattie" written by Margaret Doane Gardiner and published in the June 1905 issue of Scribner's. Others decorate pages and portray plot scenes in Edith Wharton's 1907 novel The Fruit of the Tree and in her short story "The Pretext", which is presented in Scribner's August 1908 issue. Additional novels and short stories illustrated by Kimball include Edith Macvane's The Duchess of Dreams, released in 1908; "Grantham's Limitations" by Mary Heaton Vorse for the November 1908 issue of Scribner's; the 1911 novel Uncertain Irene by Katharine Holland Brown; Amélie Rives Troubetzkoy's novel World's End, published in 1914; the 1916 novel Kildares of Storm by Eleanor Mercein Kelly; and the 1918 novel Camilla by Elizabeth Robins.

=== Kimball's artwork in advertising ===
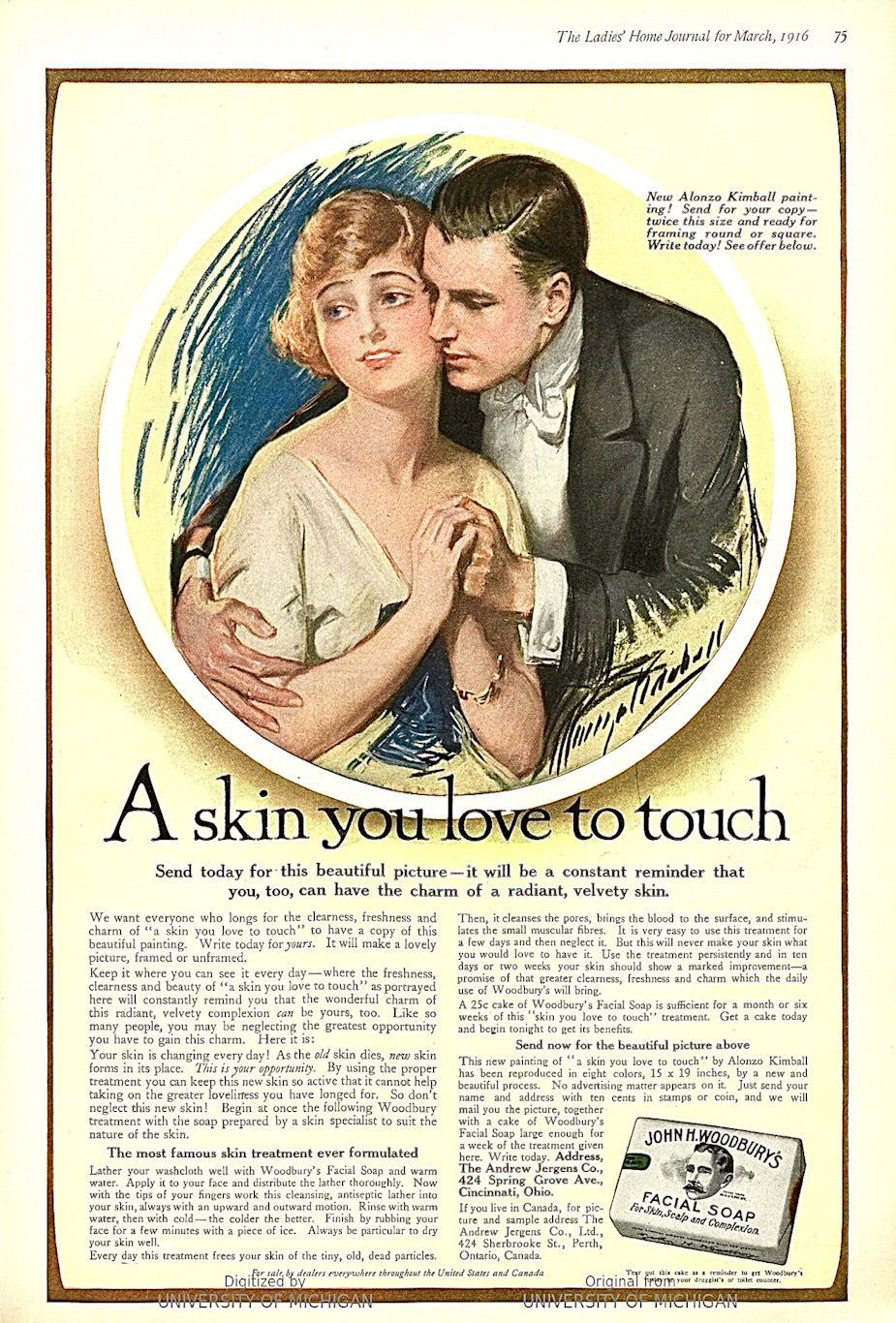
Painting by Kimball in soap advertisement, 1916

Between 1905 and the early 1920s, Kimball's artwork was used in newspaper and magazine advertisements throughout the United States to sell cameras, soaps, Torrington vacuum cleaners, men's and women's clothing, and a host of other products. An early example of Kimball's illustrations in advertising is an upperclass family scene he drew specifically for Kodak, one that shows children unwrapping one of the company's box cameras next to a Christmas tree. The advertisement with this illustration is in the December 2, 1905, issue of Collier's. In commercial advertising, clothing became Kimball's forte. Two examples of his work in that area are his depiction of a man fashionably attired in a 1909 newspaper advertisement for D. J. Kaufman's "The Men's Store" in Washington, D.C., and a large illustration that same year of a smartly dressed couple in a newspaper advertisement for "The Home of Quality Clothes", the King-Swanson Company of Omaha, Nebraska. The Detroit-based business Weil & Company, a large furniture retailer that also publicized itself as "outfitters" for men and boys, announced in newspapers in April 1911 that "one of America's most prominent illustrators" had agreed to furnish the store a series of original artwork for its advertisements. "Mr. Kimball", Weil & Company noted, "is particularly excellent in his delineation of men, creating strong types of unique character and individuality." One more example of Kimball's commercial work is a far more elaborate, full-color 1916 advertisement that includes his painting of a young woman and her attentive male companion to promote John H. Woodbury's facial soap. Published in The Ladies Home Journal and in other periodicals, the "A skin you love to touch" advertisement offered readers a cake of soap with a print of Kimball's "new" painting "ready for framing" for "ten cents in stamps or coin" ($3 today)

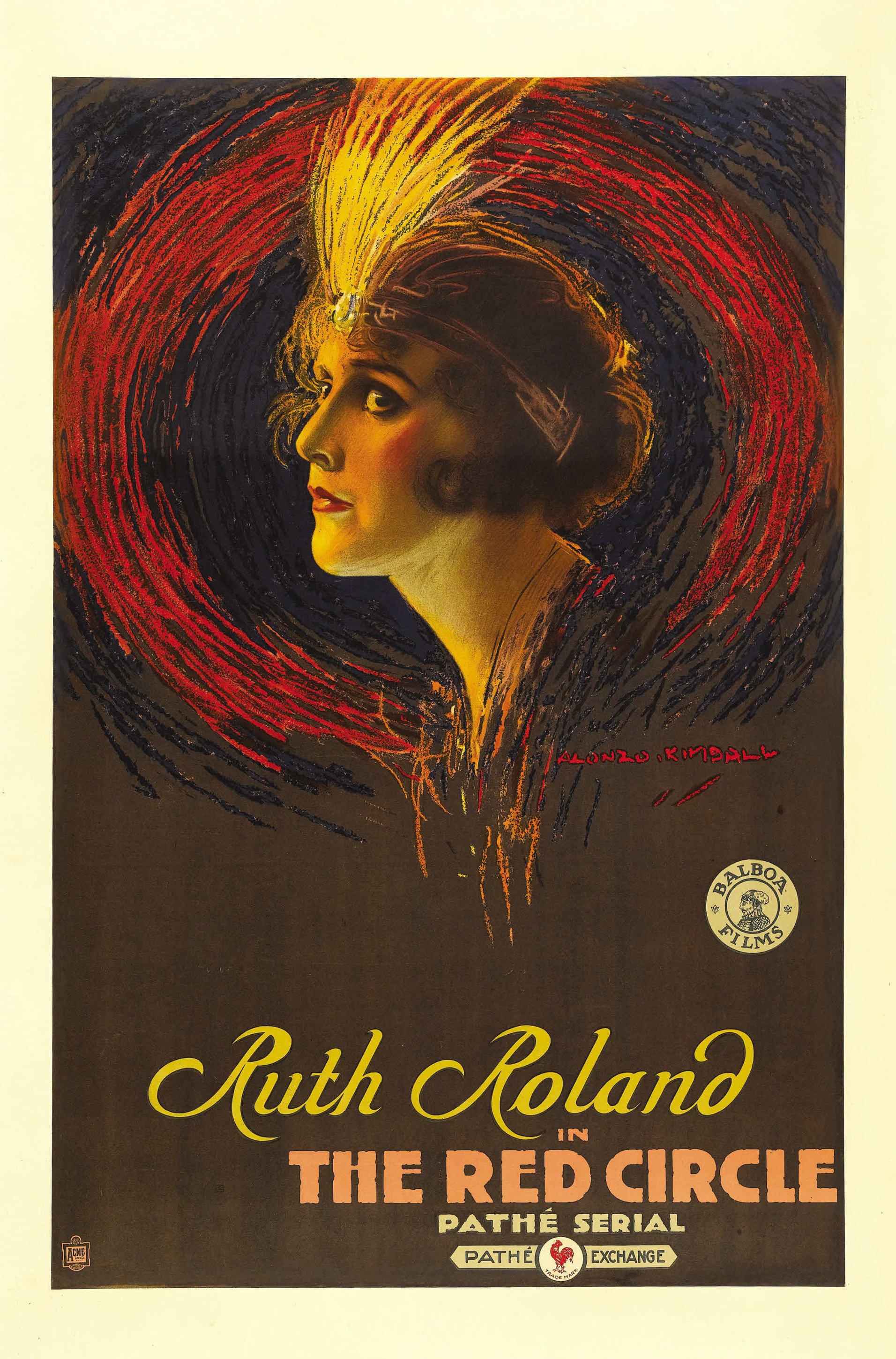
Kimball's theatrical poster for The Red Circle (1915)

By 1915, Kimball's commercial success as a portrait artist and illustrator had drawn the interest of executives in America's rapidly expanding motion picture industry. Pathé, a film studio with production facilities in Fort Lee, New Jersey, contracted Kimball to design theatrical posters for some of the company's releases and to sketch portraits of the studio's most popular female stars at the time, including Pearl White, Florence Reed, Jackie Saunders, Jeanne Eagels, and Ruth Roland. Kimball's likenesses" of those actresses proved to be so well received by moviegoers that Pathé offered individual copies and sets of his drawings for sale. In December 1915, the New York trade publication The Moving Picture World announced the studio's intentions:

Exhibitors [theater owners] everywhere have been loud in their praise of the one-sheets [posters] advertising Pathe Gold Rooster plays. These are portraits of the leading women players in the various productions, and are all painted by Alonzo Kimball, whose fame as a painter of women's heads extends beyond the boundaries of the United States. For years he has been in demand by those magazines whose beautiful covers light up the newsstands and which covers undeniably help sales. The Pathe posters made from his sketches are beautiful enough to be framed, and their advertising value to the theater that shows them is unquestioned.

Kimball continued his work in commercial advertising in the years just prior to his death. By 1920, he and his wife Madeleine had moved from New York City to Ohio, where they lived in downtown Cleveland in an apartment building on Euclid Avenue. In the federal census for that year, Alonzo confirms his occupation in Cleveland, simply identifying it as "Artist/Advertising".

=== Fashion consultant ===
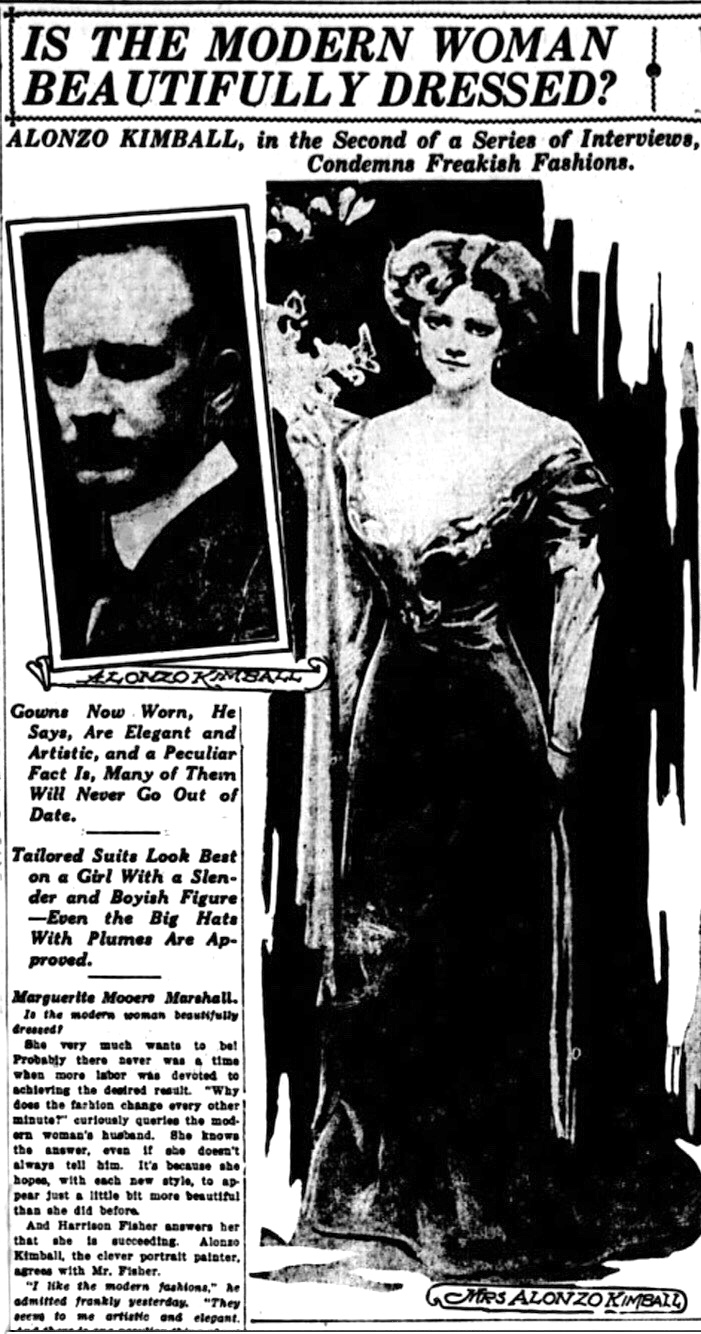
Kimball's views on fashion in The Evening World, 1912

One other commercial by-product of Kimball's artistic training and success as an illustrator and portrait painter was the development of his reputation nationwide as an expert in haute couture and in upper- and middle-class daily apparel for both men and women. Given his artist's eye for detail and the fact that the vast majority of the subjects in his paintings and drawings were portrayed in the most current and expertly tailored clothing, Kimball gained over the years a keen sense of style and practical experience depicting subjects of different body types in attire that he deemed the most flattering. That ability was greatly enhanced by his work in advertising, especially for large and select clothing establishments.

By 1912, Kimball's fashion advice and commentaries on the latest trends in men's and women's apparel were being featured and widely quoted in newspapers and magazines. In a newspaper interview with columnist Marguerite Mooers Marshall in March 1912, Kimball shared his opinions about the basic deficiencies in the styling of women's clothing at that time, most notably in their excesses. "'The freakish fashions of today are quite indefensible'", he observed, adding "'And yet I don't know that even the hobble is as bad as the hoop-skirt used to be.'" As an artist whose commissioned oil portraits needed to remain appealing to viewers for generations, Kimball chose clothing for his female subjects that had simple, timeless lines. He therefore preferred selections of attire in 1912 that, in his words, "'could have been worn equally well in the year 1812, and, presumably, in 2012.'" The following year, in a feature in The St. Louis Post-Dispatch highlighting his ideas about summer fashions, he recommended that more women should forego the norm of wearing heavier, fully enclosed shoes and enjoy instead the cooler comfort of sandals. Kimball also advised both men and women in 1913 to wear more white linen suits for "'artistically effective'" reasons as well as for improved comfort in the seasonal heat. "'White linens for either sex'", he explained, "'show off excellently against a background of green grass or blue ocean.'"

== Kimball imposter, 1907–1908 ==
Kimball's standing in art circles and his popularity with the reading public had achieved sufficient status by 1907 that at least one man took advantage of his celebrity and for many months successfully impersonated the artist. Both The New York Times and The Washington Post in March 1908 reported the hoax, which was perpetrated on the most prominent citizens of Asheville and Hendersonville, North Carolina. In a news item titled "Tricked Society Set", The Post on March 13 shared with its readers a report from Asheville about the imposter:

About two months ago a prepossessing young man registered at one of the principal hotels [in Asheville] as "Alonzo Kimball, New York." His arrival was announced in the society columns of the local papers...Some drawings were shortly afterward displayed by "Kimball" in a show window, together with some pen and ink sketches. "Kimball" was eagerly sought after by society people here. He was dined and feted, and a round of affairs were given in his honor...
He had a good tenor voice, and would sing at afternoon teas and other social affairs. He also sang in the churches, and the First Baptist Church, the largest Baptist church in the state, engaged him as a soloist and a special choir of fifty voices was organized... "Kimball" did some odd things at times, but these eccentricities were attributed to his artistic temperament. On one occasion, when invited to a very select tea, he created dismay by bringing with him a very young woman whom he had met in Asheville, but who was not a member of "the society set" and had not been invited.

The number of towns visited by the "imitation" Kimball and the duration of his fraud remain undetermined, although it was also reported that in the fall of 1907 he stayed briefly in Edneyville, North Carolina, where he "skipped out" on his $14 food bill ($502 today) and absconded with a shotgun and a prized hunting dog named "Shell". It is also undetermined whether the man's visits were limited to North Carolina. Additional reports in North Carolina in 1908 state that the man, whose real identity remained unverified, also spent the summer and early autumn of 1907 in Hendersonville, but his travels prior to that are unknown. The pretender, however, quickly disappeared after March 1908, once it was announced in the press that the real Alonzo Kimball in New York responded to telegraphic inquiries and categorically denied ever being in North Carolina.

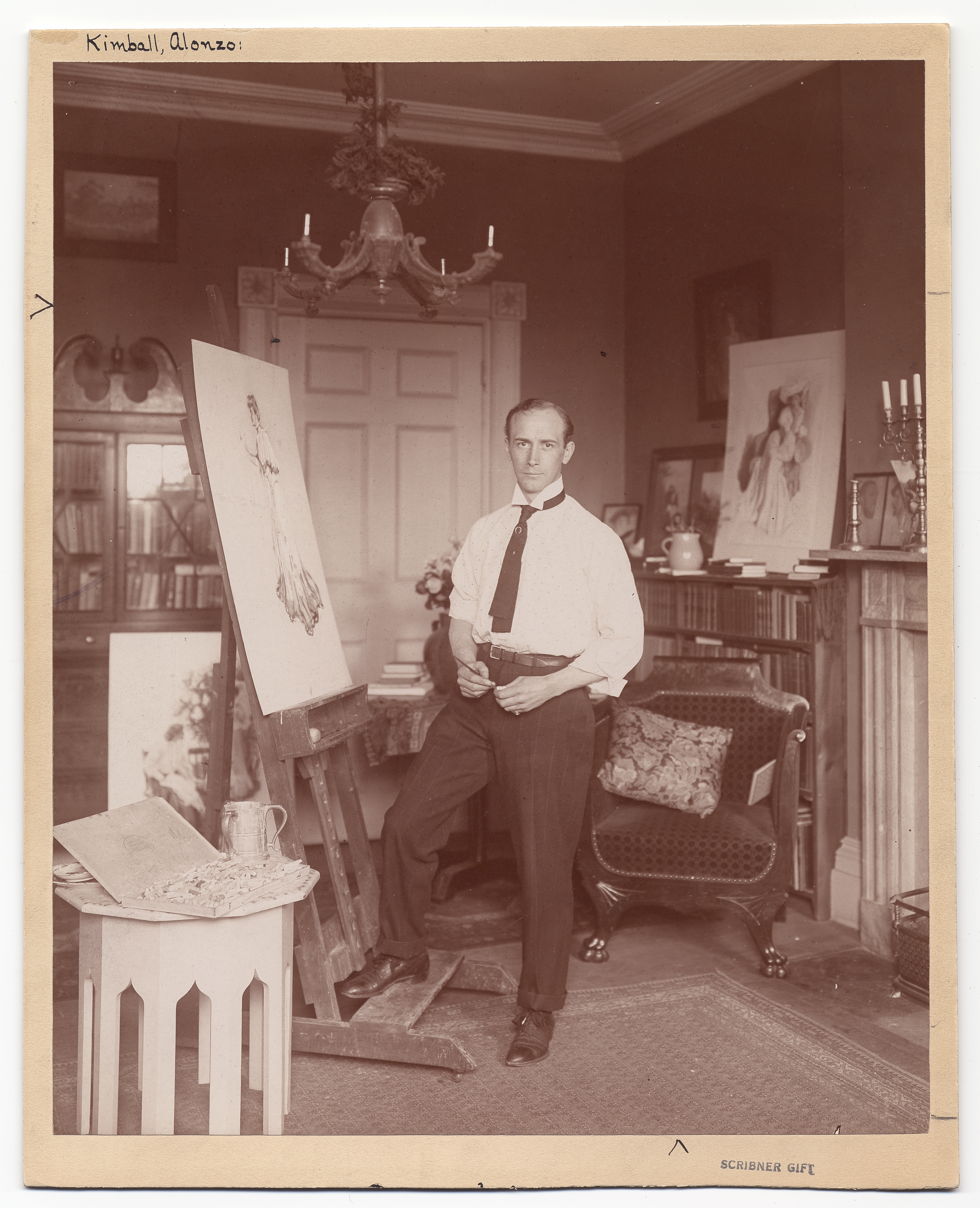
Kimball painting at his home in New York City, 1905

== Personal life and death ==
Kimball married only once, in 1902, to Iowa native Madeleine Williams. (Note: Obituaries of Alonzo Kimball in 1923 identify his wife "Madeline" being from Danville, Kentucky, but in the federal census of 1920 either Madeleine or Alonzo cited Iowa as her "Place of birth." Additional census records, however, do document that her mother was born in Kentucky; her father, in Massachusetts. Official and unofficial documents also show variations in the spelling of Madeleine, sometimes being cited as Madeline, Madaline, Madalin, Madalen, and Madalaine. In her personal signature on a June 2, 1924 affidavit for her son's passport application for the U.S. State Department, she clearly spells her name "Madeleine".) She and Alonzo remained together until his death, and during their marriage they had one child, son Weston, who was born on November 9, 1905, in Flushing, New York.

Kimball's health in the spring of 1923 began to decline considerably over several months due to cardiovascular disease. Although he and Madaleine were still residing in Cleveland that year, Alonzo died from a heart attack in August in Evanston, Illinois, while visiting his stepmother Ella Celestia Kimball. He was survived by his wife, his 17-year-old son, and his half-sister Marjorie (née Kimball) Hall. In its August 28 obituary for Kimball, The New York Times reports that after funeral services were held for the artist in Evanston, his body was transferred to Cooperstown, New York, for cremation. (Note: Alonzo Myron Kimball's father was buried in Lakewood Cemetery in Cooperstown, N.Y., in 1905. The record "Illinois, Cook County Deaths, 1871–1998" available in the database FamilySearch states that Alonzo's remains after the 1923 funeral service in Evanston were intended for transfer to Graceland Cemetery in Chicago, but searches there show no entry for Alonzo Myron Kimball. Kimball was reportedly very close to his stepmother Ella Celestia (née Peak) Kimball); and, as cited, he was visiting her in Illinois when he died in 1923. Later, when she died in 1930, Ella was also buried in Cooperstown, New York.)

== Partial list of books and short stories illustrated by Kimball ==
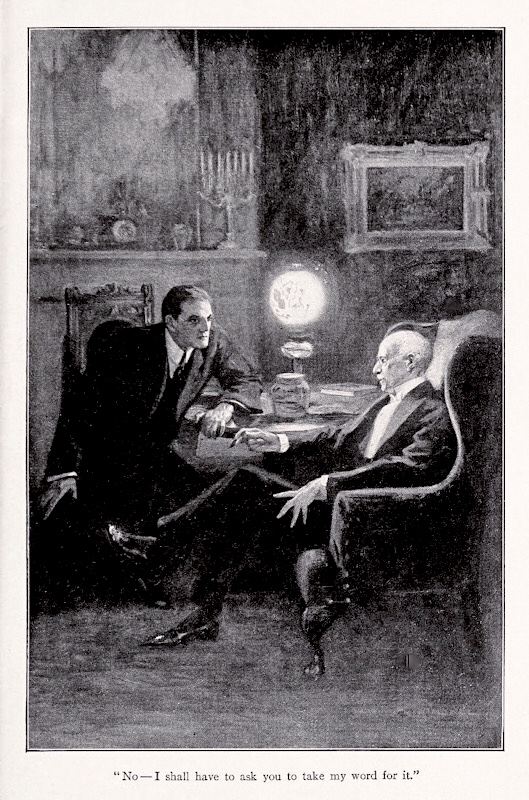
The Fruit of the Tree by Edith Wharton, 1907

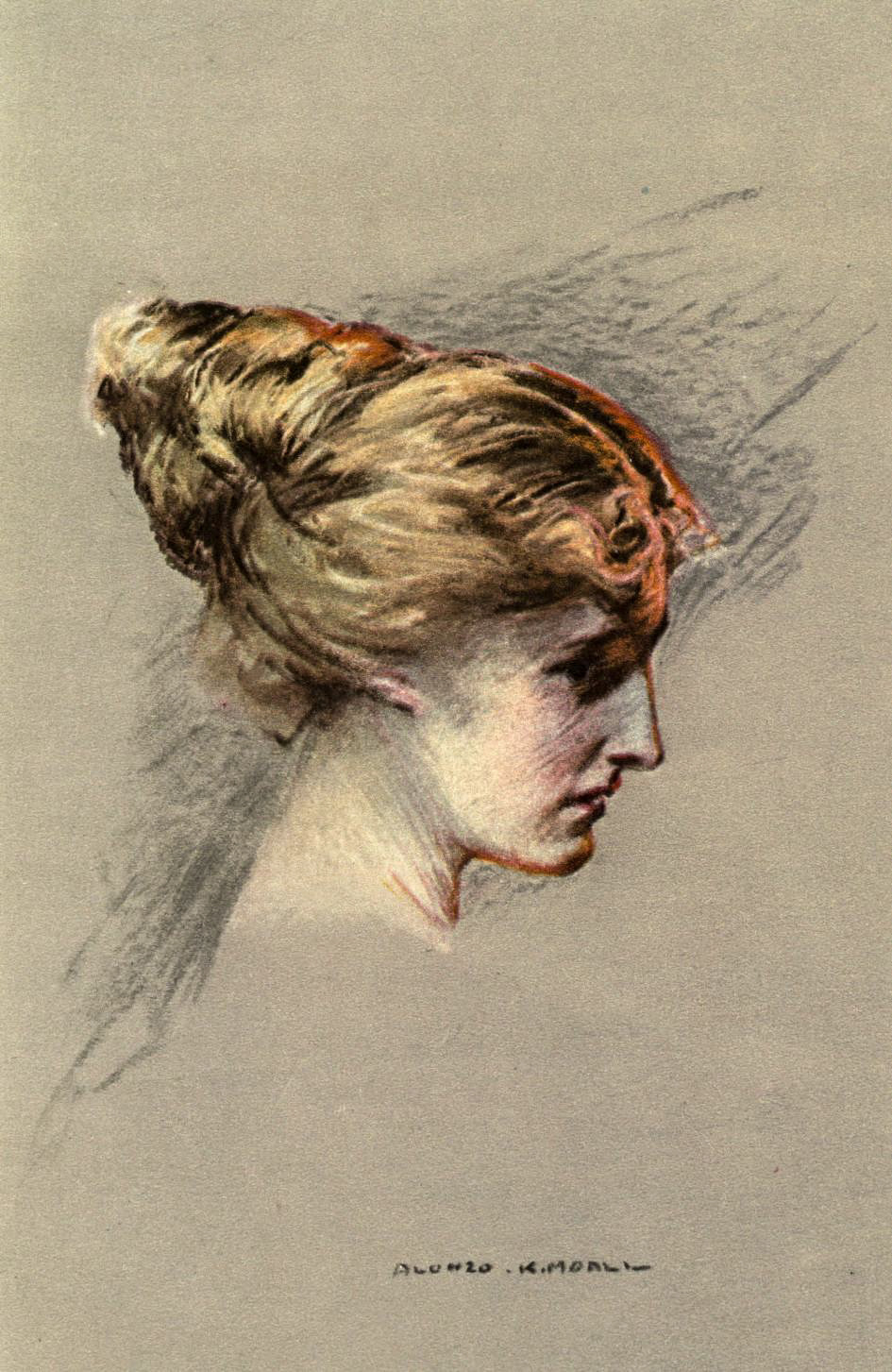
Pastel portrait in Brian Hooker's The Right Man, 1908

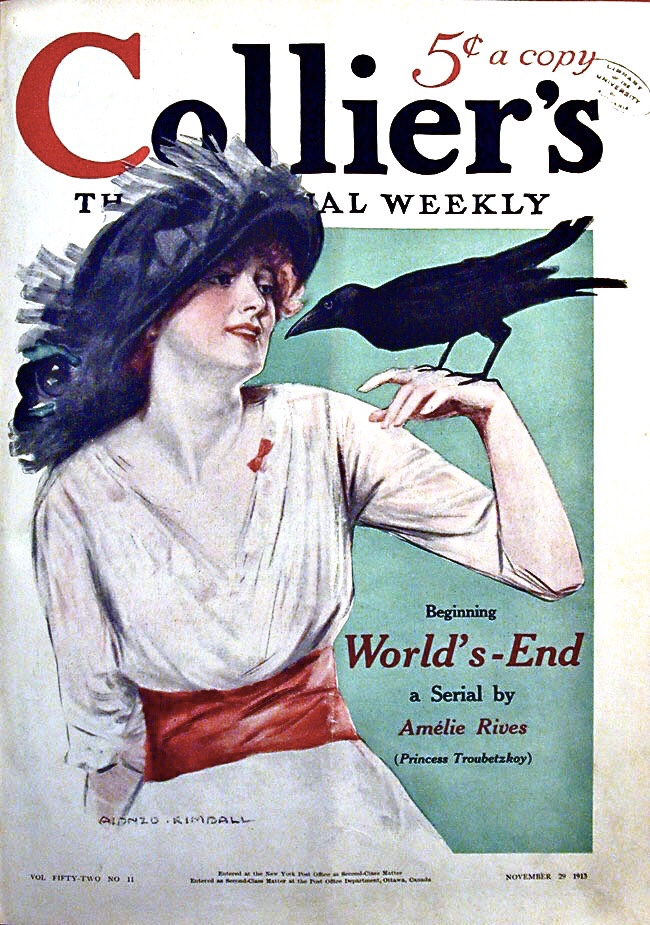
Kimball cover, 1913

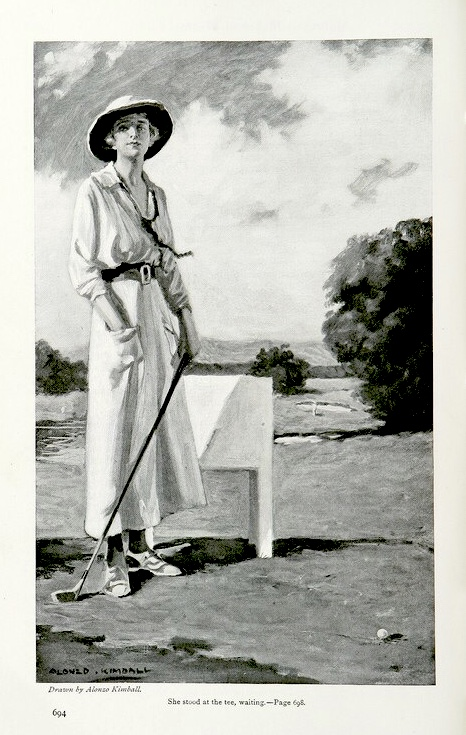
"The Golf Cure" in Scribner's, 1917

- "The Golf Cure" by Lawrence Perry in Scribner's Magazine (June 1917)
- The Man Who Tried To Be It by Cameron Mackenzie (1917)
- Kildares of Storm by Eleanor Mercein Kelly (1916)
- The Long Road Home by Ralph Delahaye Paine (1916)
- Enoch Crane by Francis Hopkinson Smith (1916)
- Mr. and Mrs. Pierce: A Story of Youth by Cameron Mackenzie (1916)
- The Red Mist: A Tale of Civil Strife by Randall Parrish (1914)
- World's End by Amélie Rives (1914)
- Shea of the Irish Brigade: A Soldier's Story by Randall Parrish, frontispiece (1914)
- The Wall Between by Ralph Delahaye Paine (1914)
- The Lapse of Enoch Wentworth by Isabel Gordon Curtis; frontispiece by Kimball (1913)
- Years of Discretion by Frederic Hatton and Fanny Locke Hatton (1913)
- Gordon Craig, Soldier of Fortune by Randall Parrish (1912)
- My Lady of Doubt by Randall Parrish (1911)
- "Monseigneur Plays" by Theodosia Garrison, poem in Scribner's Magazine (June 1911)
- Uncertain Irene by Katharine Holland Brown (1911)
- Love Under Fire by Randall Parrish (1911)
- "His People" by Mabel Herbert Urner in Cosmopolitan (September 1909)
- "The Bud and the Butler" by Arthur Stanwood Pier, Evening Star (March 14, 1909)
- My Lady of the South by Randall Parrish (1909)
- Elusive Isabel by Jacques Futrelle (1909)
- The Eternal Feminine; And Other Stories by Mary Raymond Shipman Andrews (1908)
- "Grantham's Limitations" by Mary Heaton Vorse in Scribner's (November 1908)
- "My Lady of Mystery" by Jacques Futrelle, serialized in Evening Star (1908)
- The Sentimental Adventures of Jimmy Bulstrode by Marie Van Vorst (1908)
- Kincaid's Battery by George Washington Cable (1908)
- The Duchess of Dreams by Edith Macvane, color frontispiece (1908)
- The Stage Door by Charles Belmont Davis (1908)
- The Right Man by Brian Hooker (1908)
- The Fruit of the Tree by Edith Wharton (1907)
- Madame de Treymes, novella by Edith Wharton (1907)
- "Everyman's Riddle" by Charles Belmont Davis, Scribner's (January 1907)
- Lucy of the Stars by Frederick Palmer (1906)
- McAllister and his Double by Arthur Train; co-illustrated by Kimball and F. C. Yohn (1905)
- The Wood Fire in No. 3 by Francis Hopkinson Smith (1905)
- Reveillon by Winfield Scott Moody (1905)
- "Exit the Prince" by Carter Goodloe, Scribner's (August 1905)
- "Pattie" by Margaret Doane Gardiner, Scribner's Magazine (June 1905)
- "Extradition" by Arthur Train, Scribner's Magazine (March 1905)
- The Orchid by Robert Grant (1905)
- His Little World: The Story of Hunch Badeau by Samuel Merwin (1903)
