= Georgetown Visitation Preparatory School =

Private school in Washington, D.C., US

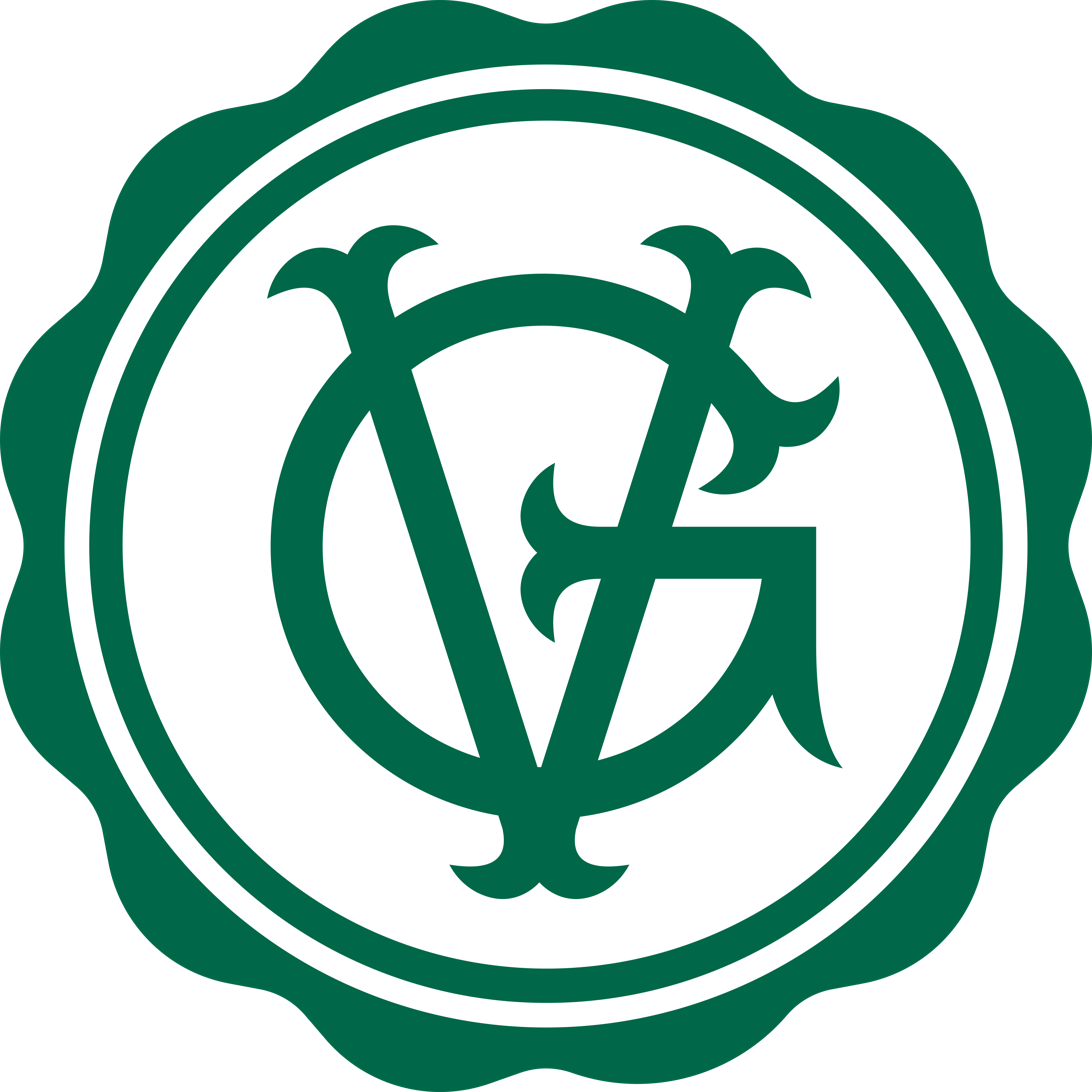

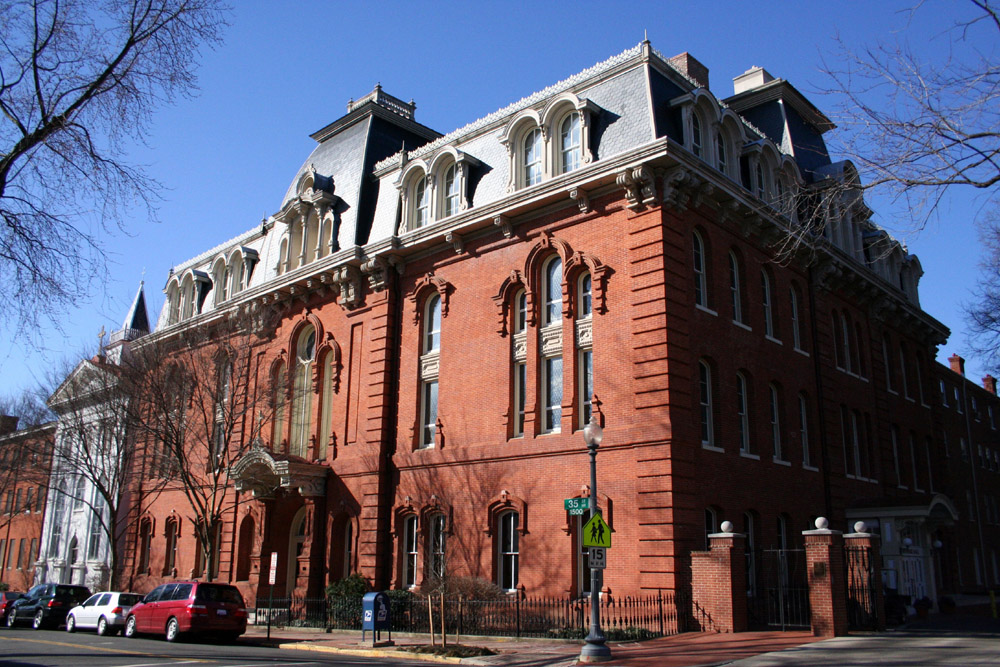
- Founders Hall, the main academic building

Location
- 1524 35th Street, N.W. Washington, D.C. 20007; United States; 38°54′34″N 77°4′9″W

Information
- Type: Private High School
- Motto: Fides et Scientia (Faith and Knowledge)
- Founded: 1799 (227 years ago)
- School district: Archdiocese of Washington Catholic Schools
- CEEB code: 090080
- President: Barbara McGraw Edmondson, Ed.D.
- Dean: Sue Foreman
- Principal: Leonor Limarzi Ponzio
- Faculty: 48
- Grades: 9–12
- Gender: Female
- Enrollment: Approximately 500
- Student to teacher ratio: 9:1
- Campus size: 45 acres (0.18 km^{2})
- Campus type: Urban
- Colors: Green, gold, white
- Song: Cor Jesu
- Athletics: 21 teams
- Athletics conference: Independent School League
- Sports: 13 sports
- Mascot: The Gold Team - Tigers; The White Team - Bears
- Team name: The Cubs
- Accreditation: Middle States Association of Colleges and Schools
- Tuition: $37,485
- Website: www.visi.org

Georgetown Visitation Preparatory School is a private college-preparatory school for girls located in the historic Washington, D.C. neighborhood of Georgetown. Founded in 1799 by the Order of the Visitation of Holy Mary (also known as the Visitation Sisters), it is one of the oldest continuously-operating schools for girls in the country and the city as well as the oldest Catholic school for girls in the original Thirteen Colonies. It is located within the Archdiocese of Washington, but operates independently of the Archdiocese.

== History ==
Georgetown Visitation was founded in 1799. It is the oldest Catholic school for girls in the original 13 colonies. The school opened near Georgetown University (then Georgetown College) because its fourth President, Father Leonard Neale, S.J., (later Bishop and Archbishop) co-founded the Academy and Convent. He invited Alice Lalor, Maria McDermott and Maria Sharpe to join him; these founders would come to be called "The Three Pious Ladies."

Rome recognized the Georgetown Visitation Order in 1816; on May 24, 1828, the Sisters were incorporated by Congress, an act signed by President John Quincy Adams, who, a few months later, handed out awards at the commencement exercises. By this time, students were learning geography, history, mythology, astronomy, chemistry, French, Spanish, and vocal & instrumental music.

From 1800 to 1862, Georgetown Visitation subsidized its mission by the forced labor and sale of enslaved people, 121 of whom have been identified, either by name or brief description. Primary sources tell of manumissions, self-emancipations, and the freeing of all people whom Visitation enslaved with the District of Columbia Emancipation Act on April 16, 1862.

The school continued to grow and evolve in the 20th century, focusing on high school and Junior College students. Beloved traditions such as Marshmallow Roast, a good-natured class competition with skits that "roast" faculty, and Gold-White, a school-wide intramural athletic competition, began in the early decades of this century. By the mid-sixties, the school started seeing a decline in the number of resident students and Junior College students; the Junior College was closed in 1964 and the boarding school was closed in 1975.

=== Fire and rebuilding ===
On July 8–9, 1993, a fire destroyed the historic main academic building of the campus, the Starkweather Academy Building, causing an initially estimated $3.5 million in damages. Trailers were brought in to serve as temporary classrooms in time for the start of the 1993–1994 academic year. The building was restored and rededicated as Founders Hall on May 5, 1995. Since then, the campus has been revitalized with the Catharine E. Nolan Center for the Performing Arts and the Sarah and Charles T. Fisher Athletic Center completed for the bicentennial of the school in 1999, and the renovation of both St. Joseph's Hall and the St. Bernard Library in 2002 and 2003. In 2019, the school opened Berchmans Hall, named for Sister Mary Berchmans Hannan, VHM, '48 & '50, a two-story addition to St. Joseph's Hall with classrooms, science labs, and an art studio. The covered walkway between St. Bernard Library and St. Joseph’s Hall became the Saints Connector, with common areas and the McNabb Innovation Lab, named for Sister Mary de Sales McNabb, VHM, '48. Modern facilities are located side-by-side with historic buildings boasting a myriad of architectural styles, ranging from Victorian to Neo-Gothic.

=== 21st Century ===
In the early 2000s, Visitation's focus and identity started to shift. An increase in interest and focus on science and mathematics courses led to the update and development of new lab spaces, a creators' space, more advanced equipment, and the hiring of doctorate-level biology, chemistry, and mathematics faculty.

Simultaneously, the school experienced a sharp decline in the number of religious sisters. This caused an increase in layperson involvement, with key leadership positions changing from priest or religious to laymen and women.

With these changes came a more progressive attitude and understanding of religious topics, such as diversity, equity, and inclusivity, which mirrored the evolving priorities of the Washington Diocese. The 2010s and 2020s saw school-wide projects, initiatives, positions, and research that emphasized these current issues.

== Traditions ==
Visitation traditionally held its graduation ceremonies in the Odeon, an auditorium where John Quincy Adams addressed the graduates of 1828. After the Odeon was destroyed in the fire of Founder's Hall, graduation ceremonies were moved to Georgetown University’s Gaston Hall.

== Notable alumnae ==
- Cayetana Aljovín, Peruvian lawyer, journalist and public administrator
- Emily Bratti, ice dancer
- Caitlin Brunell, Miss Alabama
- Bay Buchanan, treasurer of the United States
- Marian Canney (1921–2019), faculty member and Korean War widow
- Madeleine Vinton Dahlgren, author, anti-suffragist
- Ella Loraine Dorsey (1853–1935), author, journalist, translator
- Jennifer Dougherty, first female mayor of Frederick, Maryland
- Maggie Rose, country music artist (see Maggie Rose)
- Mary Early, sculptor
- Jacqueline Getty Phillips, socialite and thoroughbred breeder
- Angela Gillespie, religious sister, Abbess
- Ida Marie Honoré, socialite and philanthropist
- Eleanor Mercein Kelly, author, four stories adapted to film and one to theatre on Broadway
- Colleen Kollar-Kotelly, judge
- Harriet Lane, U.S. first lady
- Laura Mako, interior designer
- Francine Mathews, mystery writer
- Liz McCartney, cofounder of the St. Bernard Project, 2008 CNN Hero of the Year
- Harriet Monroe, founder and editor of Poetry magazine
- Bertha Palmer, (1849–1918), impressionist art collector, entrepreneuse, philanthropist
- Marie Ahnighito Peary, writer, philanthropist, and daughter of famous polar explorer Robert Peary
- Emily Warren Roebling, known for her contribution to the completion of the Brooklyn Bridge
- Maggie Rose, singer (see Margaret Durante)
- Evan Ryan, assistant for intergovernmental affairs and public liaison for vice president Joe Biden
- Alice Smith, singer
- Mary Logan Tucker, political activist
- Barbara Walsh, American musical theater actor

== Other notable figures ==
- Mary Paulina Finn
- Leola Isabel Freeman
- Elizabeth Hesselblad
- Juana de Iturbide y Huarte
- Marie Louise Kirkland
- Teresa Lalor
- Rose Hawthorne Lathrop
- Sister Margarita of Jesus, Princess of Mexico; daughter of Agustin de Iturbide, Emperor of Mexico
- Sarah Moormann Scharper
- Frances Benjamin Johnston Photographed Georgetown Visitation classrooms in early 1900s

== Popular culture ==
In 1850, John H. Hewitt wrote the Grand Promenade March and dedicated it to the "Sisters of the Academy of Visitation, Georgetown."
