= Liz McCartney =

American philanthropist

Liz McCartney cofounded SBP (formerly the St. Bernard Project) in March 2006 to rebuild homes destroyed by Hurricane Katrina in the St. Bernard Parish of Louisiana, southeast of New Orleans. She is the 2008 CNN Hero of the Year and was nominated for CNN Superhero of the Decade.

== Biography ==
A native of Washington, DC, McCartney attended Georgetown Visitation Preparatory School. She graduated from Boston College in 1994 and received a master's degree in curriculum and instruction from the George Washington University. McCartney served in the Peace Corps in Lesotho, South Africa. She has also taught ESL and middle school. Before starting SBP, McCartney was the Executive Director of a community-based nonprofit organization in Washington, DC which provided technology-based after school and summer programs for young people attending DC public schools. McCartney and Zack Rosenburg volunteered in St. Bernard Parish in March 2006 after the storm. They then quit their jobs in Washington, returned to Louisiana in June 2006, and the following August they cofounded the St. Bernard Project. As of July 2012, over 45,000 volunteers have rebuilt more than 440 hurricane-damaged homes in St. Bernard Parish and New Orleans with the St. Bernard Project.

== Awards ==
- In 2007, Liz McCartney and Zack Rosenburg made Gambit's "40 under 40" list of successful young New Orleanians.
- Liz and Zack received the Manhattan Institute for Policy Research Social Entrepreneurship Award in 2008.
- On May 3, 2008, Senator Mary Landrieu presented Liz and Zack with the Heroes of the Storm Award.
- On January 5, 2009 Liz and Zack were named Gambit Weekly's New Orleanians of the Year 2008.
- Liz McCartney was voted the 2008 CNN Hero of the Year (CNN Heroes) on November 27, 2008.
- Liz McCartney was named the "2010 Woman of Excellence for Community Service" by Wiley College

According to CNN's website:

- "Liz McCartney is dedicated to helping Hurricane Katrina survivors in St. Bernard Parish, a community just outside New Orleans. Her nonprofit St. Bernard Project has rebuilt the homes of more than 120 families."

== See also ==
- CNN Heroes
