= Mary Paulina Finn =

Roman Catholic nun and author

Sister Mary Paulina Finn V. H. M.
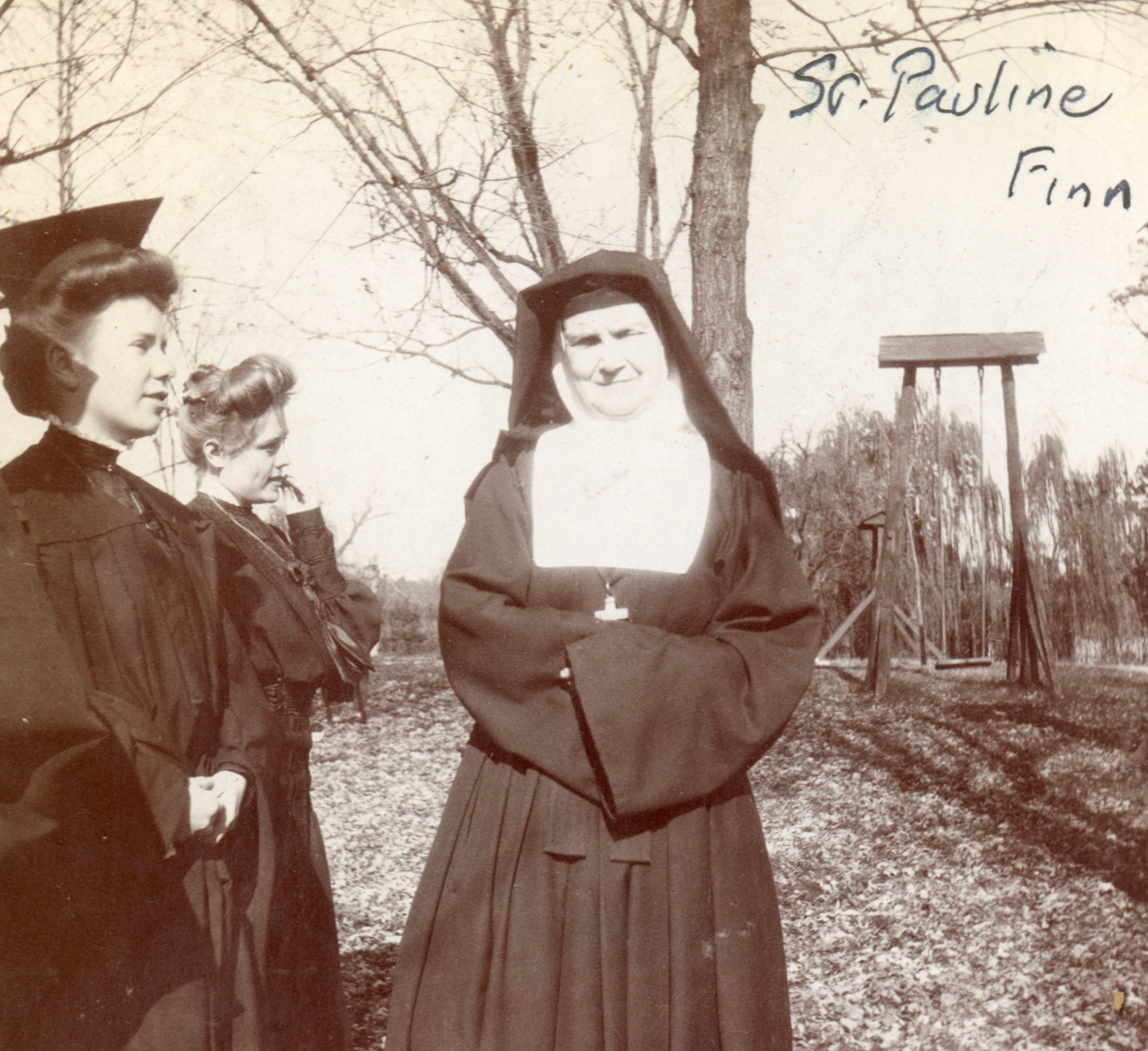
- Finn, c. 1910

Personal life
- Born: January 1, 1842 Boston, Massachusetts
- Died: February 28, 1935 (aged 93) Washington, DC
- Pen name: M. S. Pine
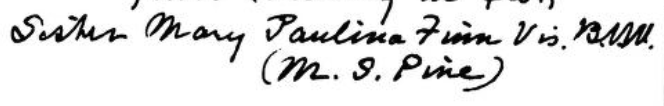
- Signature

Religious life
- Religion: Roman Catholic

Mary Paulina Finn (January 1, 1842 – February 28, 1935), known to the literary world by her pen name, M. S. Pine, was a Roman Catholic nun at the Georgetown Visitation Monastery in Washington, DC. Known as Sister Paulina, she was a playwright, poet, and author, and she headed the school's English Department for 50 of her 68 years at Visitation.

== Career ==
Besides her own accomplishments, Sr. Finn fostered the careers of Agnes Repplier, Eleanor Mercein Kelly, and of Harriet Monroe, founder of Poetry. Kelly and Monroe were graduates of Georgetown Visitation Preparatory School, and Repplier was a devout Catholic who attended school in Philadelphia but knew Finn. She maintained friendships with other prominent people including Visitation alumnae Bertha Palmer, Ida Marie Honoré, and Mary Logan Tucker, and priests William Henry O'Connell, the Cardinal-Archbishop of Boston, and poet-priest John Banister Tabb. She also knew the French Jesuit and anthropologist Marcel Jousse S. J., Paulist priest Walter Elliott, and Jesuit priest Thomas I. Gasson, all of whom were part of a large concelebration at her Golden Jubilee in 1919, along with Mary Logan Tucker. Her book about John Banister Tabb was positively reviewed by Frank Lebby Stanton, the first poet laureate of Georgia.

One of her nephews was the Rev. William J. Finn, C.S.P., director of the Paulist Choristers, performing annually at the Metropolitan Opera and regularly on television. He presided at her funeral mass in the Visitation chapel. She was survived by one sister living in Boston, and was buried on the grounds of Georgetown Visitation Monastery.

== Selected works ==
- 1913: The Alma Mater of the Georgetown Centennial and Other Dramas (New York: Munder-Thomsen Press).
- 1915: John Banister Tabb: the Priest-Poet (New York: Munder-Thomsen Press).
- 1916: Pine, M. S. (1916). The Venerable Don Bosco, the Apostle of Youth – via Wikisource. (Philadelphia: Salesian Press, Don Bosco Institute).
- 1917: A Glory of Maryland (Poem in honor of Archbishop Leonard Neale, founder of the Visitation in Georgetown)
- 1921: Counsels of Jesus to Sister Benigna Consolata Ferrero, Religious of the Visitation, of Como, Italy, 1885-1916. Translation by M. S. Pine from the Community Circular of Como. (Chicago, Illinois: John P. Daleiden Co.)
- 1925: Sacred Poems

Theater historian Cecilia Young claimed that Finn wrote all of her works in pencil.
