= Leola Isabel Freeman =

American artist and gallery owner

Leola Isabel Freeman (March 21, 1900 - August 21, 1989) was an American artist and gallery owner. She specialized in landscapes, portraiture, and Mexican genre paintings. The bulk of her career took place in El Paso, Texas.

== Early life and education ==
Freeman was born Leola Isabel Warnock in Gonzalez, Texas to William Joseph Warnock and Josephine Cecilia (née Sheley). In 1904 the family relocated to El Paso, Texas where W. J. Warnock established a dental practice. Freeman graduated from St. Mary's Grammar School in 1914, and St. Joseph's Academy (now Loretto Academy) in 1917. From 1917 to 1919 she attended Georgetown Visitation School (then called Georgetown Visitation Convent School) in Washington D. C. as part of a two-year program designed for high-school graduates

Freeman returned to El Paso in 1919, where she studied painting with portrait painter Lloyd Freeman, nephew on his mother's side of Knoxville, Tennessee painter, Lloyd Branson.

Freeman studied at the Pennsylvania Academy of Fine Arts from 1921 to 1922 under Impressionist Daniel Garber, landscape and portrait painter Joseph Thurmond Pearson, Jr., and illustrator Henry Bainbridge McCarter.

In 1922 she married her former teacher, painter Lloyd Freeman, in Richmond, Virginia. The couple settled in Greensboro, North Carolina and had four children. In 1929 one of Leola Freeman's photographs was the North Carolina state prize winner in the Eastman Kodak Company’s nationwide child photography contest. She was widowed in 1930 when her husband Lloyd Freeman died of pneumonia, following which she moved back to El Paso with her children.

== Career ==
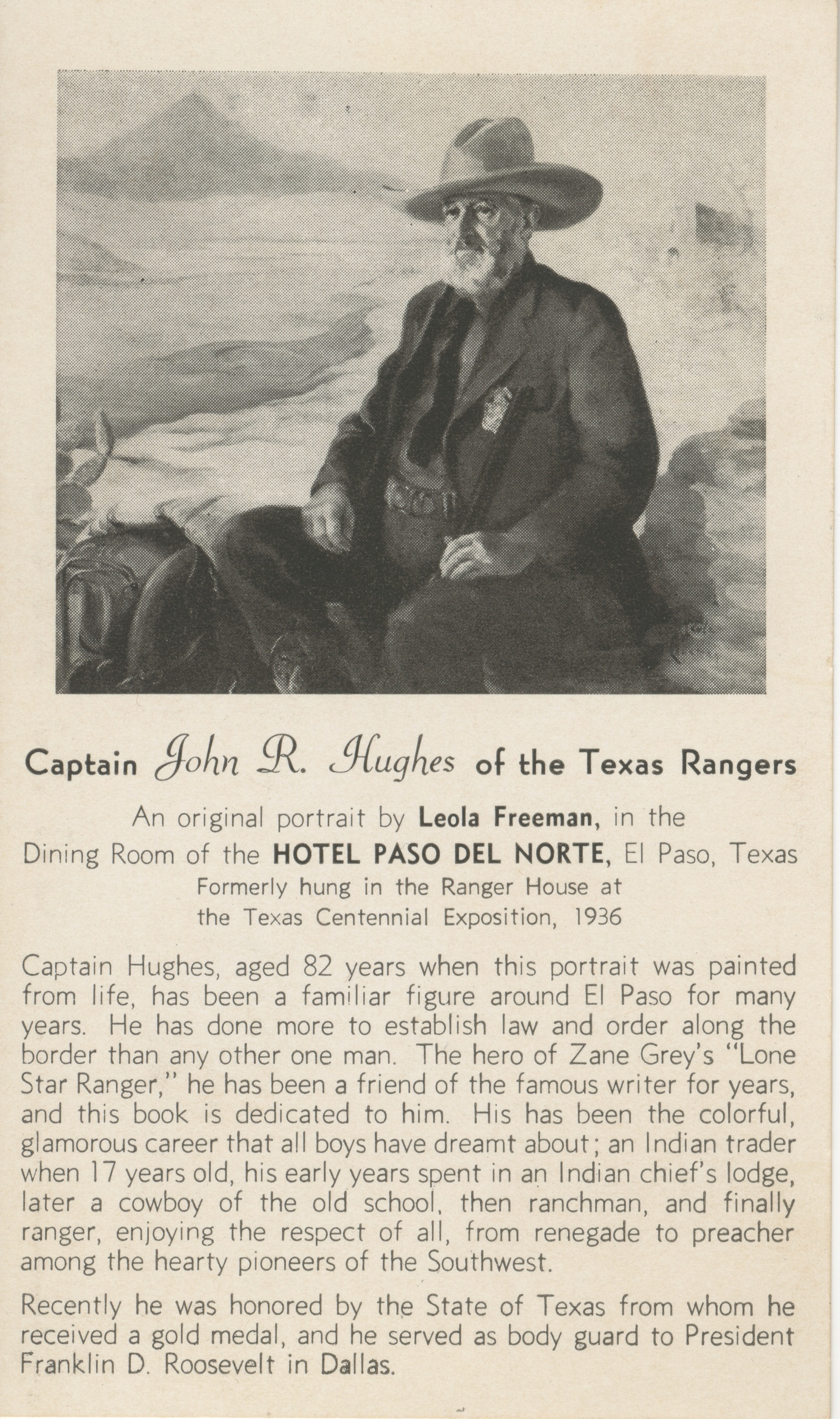
Postcard picturing Leola Freeman's painting "Lone Star Ranger"

After returning to El Paso, Freeman set up an art studio next to her father's dental practice where she gave lessons in drawing and painting. She mounted her first solo exhibit in 1931. In March 1934, Freeman was among seven El Paso artists to be awarded a Public Works of Art Project contract. For the PWAP she painted oil portraits of the men responsible for obtaining El Paso's first city charter, Judges Joseph Magoffin and Allen Blacker. Magoffin was an El Paso pioneer and the builder of the historic Magoffin Homestead.

In 1936 Freeman's oil portrait of Texas Ranger Captain John R. Hughes, titled "Lone Star Ranger" after the novel by Zane Grey, was hung in the Ranger House as part of the 1936 Texas Centennial in Dallas. The painting pictured the aged Ranger in a sombrero against a desert backdrop. Freeman also carved a custom frame for the painting.

In 1937 Freeman moved her studio to room 322 of El Paso's historic Hotel Paso del Norte, where she often mounted exhibitions and hosted soirées with local and national, and international artists, including José Ruiz de Rivera, Hari Kidd, and Urbici Soler. Soler was her close friend and confidant during the late 1930s and early 1940s and it was at her studio that he met American Journalist Ernie Pyle, who subsequently dedicated one of his columns to the Spanish sculptor. During this period Freeman also served, along with fellow artist Tom Lea and others, as a judge in the Miss Southwest contest, held in the Hotel Paso del Norte as part of El Paso's Harvest festival.

It was at her studio in the Hotel Paso del Norte that she met her second husband, an Irish watercolorist named Michael Mochgoilrhe. They were married in Juarez, Mexico in 1945.

=== Leola Freeman Gallery ===
In the mid-1940s, with the help of her second husband, Freeman built an adobe home and artist's studio in the Val Verde section of El Paso at 363 South Concepcion street. In 1951 she opened El Paso's first art gallery in this same location. The Leola Freeman Art Gallery showcased work by American painters such as Thomas Moran, Robert C. Minor, and Charles Appel, as well as paintings, sculpture, and ceramics by regional artists from Texas and New Mexico.

When Freeman's younger son, Bill Freeman, took up the artist's mantle, becoming a painter of wildlife and ranch scenes, Mother and son had a joint exhibit at the Leola Freeman Gallery in 1953.

== Final years ==
After the death of her second husband in 1953, Freeman painted a portrait in his memory of the Bishop of the Catholic Diocese of El Paso, Sydney Metzger. After the death of her first-born son in a car accident in 1954, and then of her father in 1956, Freeman's career slowed. Though no longer as central a figure in the local art scene, she was the subject of two newspaper profiles, once as “Woman of the Week” in 1956 and once as “Artist of the Month” in 1961.

In 1970 Freeman left El Paso and moved to Cuernavaca, Mexico where she spent five years volunteering as a language tutor and secretary at the Neustros Pequeños Hermanos orphanage. In 1979 she moved to the Carolinas to be cared for by her eldest daughter.

Freeman died of complications from Alzheimer's disease on August 21, 1989.

== Selected exhibitions ==
1933 - Annual Texas Artist Exhibition, Fort Worth

1935 - Texas Federation of Women's Clubs, Austin

1936 - Texas Centennial Exposition, Dallas; Annual Texas Artist Exhibition, Fort Worth

1938 - Elisabet Ney Museum, Austin

1940 - Coronado Cuarto Centennial Exposition, Albuquerque

1950 - Painting and Sculpture Annual Exhibition, Fort Worth

1981 - Early El Paso Artists, El Paso Centennial Museum

1993 - Women Artist of Texas 1850-1950, Panhandle-Plains Historical Museum, Canyon, Texas

2010 - Into the Desert Light: Early El Paso Art 1850-1960, El Paso Museum of Art

== Permanent collections ==
=== El Paso Museum of Art ===
Portrait of a Boy with Dog, 1950-1959. Pastel on paper, 36 x 30 in.

Portrait of Elizabeth Gaidry, 1960-1969. Oil on canvas, 38 1/ 8 x 40 1/8 in.

Lieutenant Colonel Albert A. King, c. 1942. Oil on canvas, 28 x 22 in.

Portrait of Ruth Eleanor King, 1938-1945. Oil on canvas, 24 x 20 in.

Portrait of Marvin Foust. 1965. Pastel, 23 x 19 in.

=== El Paso International Art Museum ===
(Untitled) Portrait of Mr. and Mrs. W. S. Warnock's sons Dickey, Scotty, and Sheley Jr. Oil on canvas. 41 1/2 x 21 1/2 in.

=== Magoffin Homestead ===
(Untitled) Sketch of a baby. 1940s-50s est. Pencil on art board. 9 x 7.75 in.

James Russell Bartlett (based on Henry Cheever's Pratt painting). Before 1975. Oil on canvas. 35 x 29 in.

Portrait of Octavia Glasgow. 1930s-40s est. Pastel on paper. 27.5 x 22 in.

Portrait of Josephine Lucker, Sister of the Maryknoll Order. 1960s-70s est. Oil on canvas. 30 x 25 in.

Portrait of Brigadier General William Glasgow. 1930s-1960s est. Oil on canvas. 30 x 25 in.

== Bibliography ==
Forrester-O’Brien, Esse. Art and Artists of Texas. Tardy Publishing Company, Dallas, Texas, 1935. p. 104.

Grauer, Paula L. and Michael R. Gauer. Dictionary of Texas Artists 1800-1945 (Vol 3), Texas A & M University Press, 1999. p. 36.

Powers, John and Deborah Powers. Painters, Sculptors, & Graphic Artists, A Biographical Dictionary of Artists in Texas before 1942, Woodmont Books, Austin, Texas, 1942. p. 178.

Price, Carol Ann. Early El Paso Artists. Texas Western Press, 1983. pp. 21, 29, 50, 66

Roper, Vic. A Compilation of Artists, Sculptors, and Artisans Active in Texas Prior to 1960, Vol I: A-G, Bosque Crossing, Clifton Texas. No date. pp. 344–345.
