= Sarah Moormann Scharper =

Sarah Moormann "Sally" Scharper (October 11, 1920 - 1992) was an American actress, director, teacher, writer and lecturer.

Scharper was born October 11, 1920, in Cleveland, Ohio. She was a graduate of Schuster Martin School of Dramatic Arts in Cincinnati, Ohio, and earned her Bachelor of Arts degree in English and speech from the College of Mt. Saint Joseph in Cincinnati, Ohio, graduating magna cum laude in 1942. She received a master's in speech and drama from the Catholic University of America, Washington, D.C. Mrs. Scharper later taught speech and drama and directed at Georgetown Visitation and Catholic University.

Sarah Jane Moormann and Philip Scharper were married June 11, 1949, in Cincinnati, Ohio. Mrs. Scharper and her husband were the founders of the Bellarmine Players, a community theater in Cincinnati devoted to classic and experimental theater productions. Scharper collaborated with her husband on more than 30 documentaries for network television on issues of religious, social and culture concerns. In 1979, she was the recipient of an Emmy Award, along with her husband, for her work on the television documentary, "Pope John Paul II in Poland."

As an author and editor, Scharper worked closely with her husband, editor in chief of Orbis Books of Maryknoll, New York.
