= Randall Parrish =

American novelist (1858–1923)

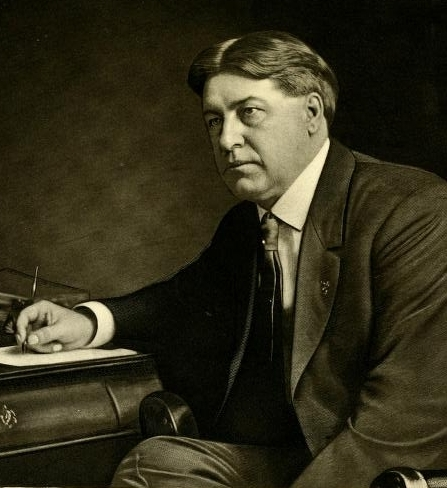
- Parrish in 1910
- Born: George Randall Parrish; June 10, 1858; Kewanee, Illinois, U.S.
- Died: August 9, 1923 (aged 65); Kewanee, Illinois, U.S.
- Education: Griswold College; Iowa State University
- Occupations: Lawyer; journalist; writer
- Spouse(s): Mary A. Hammon (m. 1887; div. 1899) Rose I. Tyrell (m. 1902)
- Children: 4
- Parent(s): Rufus Parker Parrish; Frances Adeline Hollis
- Writing career
- Genre: Dime novel

George Randall Parrish (June 10, 1858 – August 9, 1923) was an American lawyer, journalist, and writer - in particular, author of dime novels, including Wolves of the Sea (Being a Tale of the Colonies from the Manuscript of One Geoffry Carlyle, Seaman, Narrating Certain Strange Adventures Which Befell Him Aboard the Pirate Craft "Namur").

== Early life ==
Parrish was born on June 10, 1858, in the city of Kewanee, Illinois, as the only son of Rufus Parker and Frances Adeline (Hollis) Parrish. He was born in "Rose Cottage", at what was later the site of the city's Methodist Episcopal church. The old family home was at Gilmanton, New Hampshire, but Parrish' parents removed to Kewanee from Boston, where Rufus Parker Parrish had been engaged in business and was prominently associated with William Lloyd Garrison and others in the anti-slavery cause. Both parents had a wide acquaintance with multiple well-known citizens of Boston of that era, including Henry Wadsworth Longfellow, Oliver Wendell Holmes Sr., John Greenleaf Whittier, Wendell Phillips, and Ralph Waldo Emerson.

The Parrish came to Kewanee in April 1855; the husband forming connections with the pioneer store of Morse & Willard, then situated at the corner of Main and Fourth streets. A little later the firm became Parrish & Faulkner, the business finally being sold to Elias Lyman, being thus the nucleus for the department store of Lyman-Lay Company. From the time of arrival until his death in 1903, Rufus Parrish was ranked among the most prominent citizens of the community in which he conducted a bookstore and held many offices of trust. St John's Episcopal church was established and maintained largely through his efforts, and for twenty-five years, he was president of the public library board.

Younger Parrish was educated in the Kewanee public schools, graduating from the old academy building in the second class, that of 1875. In addition, he attended Allen's Academy at Lake Forest, Illinois, and Griswold College, Davenport, Iowa. Deciding upon law as a profession, he took one year at the Union College of Law, Chicago, completing his course at the Iowa State University, where he won the state bar prize for the best essay on a legal topic. He was admitted before the supreme court of Iowa in May 1879, but his certificate was withheld until he became of age. Parrish then went to Wichita, Kansas, and became an assistant in the law office of William C. Little, a year later forming a partnership with E. S. Martin, a one-time principal of the Kewanee high school. Devoting a lot of his time to politics and having achieved a reputation as a public speaker, he was elected city attorney alongside being a delegate to county and state conventions.

== Going west ==
His health starting to break down from close confinement, Parrish crossed the plains in 1882 with a cattle party, walking most of the way to Las Vegas, New Mexico. Arriving there, he discovered conditions had arisen in Wichita that left him without money, compelling him to labor at anything he could. During the following few months, he worked at tracklaying, engine wiping, and firing between Las Vegas and Albuquerque on the Atchison, Topeka & Santa Fe Railroad, finally going as a sheep driver to Fort Sumner. He was camped on the outskirts of there when Billy the Kid was killed by the sheriff of Lincoln County and saw the desperado both before and after death.

Joining a party of prospectors, the months afterwards were passed in Arizona. Gold was found, but within the limits of an Apache reservation, and the party was driven out by United States soldiers. After going through several hardships en route, Parrish reached Greeley, Colorado, and secured work on the Greeley-Loveland canal, later making his way to Denver, where he became connected as a reporter with the Rocky Mountain News and began a newspaper career, extending over a number of years, serving for various periods with metropolitan and country publications and in every branch of the work. He worked at other times on the Grafton (Nebraska) Leader, Kewanee (Illinois) Courier and Independent, Sioux City (Iowa) Times, Omaha (Nebraska) World-Herald, and the Chicago Times.

== Journalism and ministry ==
In 1886, while managing editor of the Grafton (Nebraska) Leader, Parrish was persuaded to enter the Congregational ministry, being licensed by the Elkhorn Association and given charge of churches at Leigh and Howells, Nebraska. He was later ordained by the Blue Valley Association and held pastorates at Harvard, Nebraska, Mattoon, Illinois, Constantine, Michigan, and Marshalltown, Iowa. He was chairman of the Home Missionary Committee for Southern Illinois and one of the founders of Southern Collegiate Institute at Albion. In 1888, he stumped the entire state of Nebraska under the Republican state committee, accompanied by a double quartette of ladies, and later lectured extensively throughout many northern states.

== Literary career ==
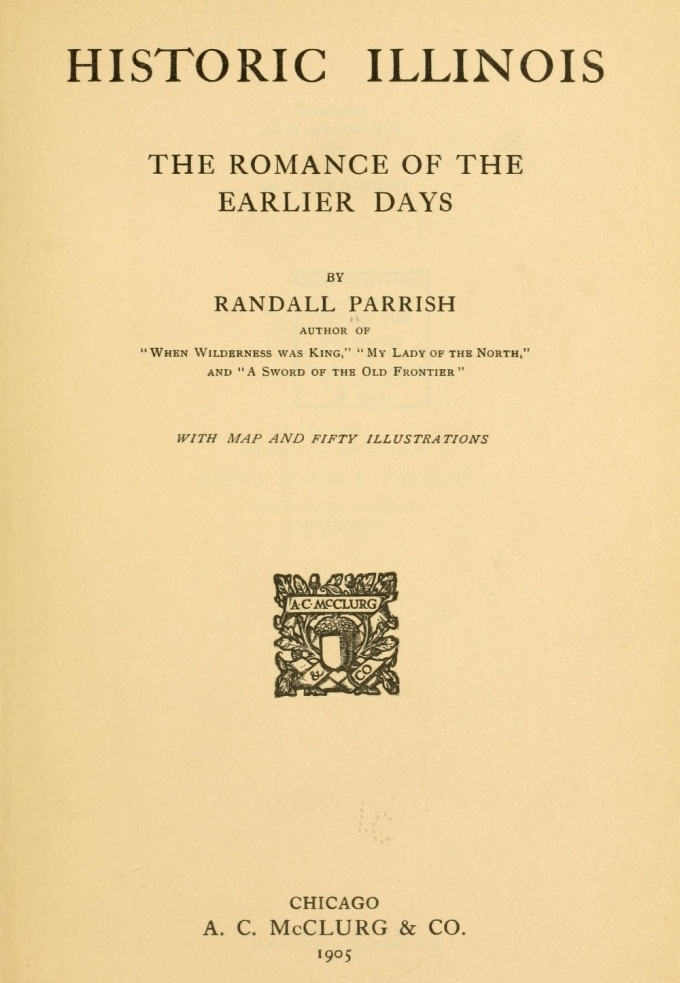
Front-page of Historic Illinois: the Romance of the Earlier Days (1905)

During the winter of 1902, Parrish resumed newspaper work in Chicago, being first connected with the Associated Press, and later engaged in commercial journalism. The following spring, he published his first work of fiction, When Wilderness Was King, through A. C. McClurg & Company, Chicago, also publishers of his subsequent books. This manuscript was submitted and accepted when half completed, and for a first book met with remarkable sale. All of his previous experience, the atmosphere of culture and refinement of his boyhood home, his literary and legal education, the hardships and privations which he endured upon the plains of the west, his campaign experiences and his labors in the ministry, all constituted a preparation and equipment for the work which he is now doing in the literary world, and which has made him one of the most successful of the modern writers.

After the publication of his first book, he devoted his entire time to literary work, having published the following books of fiction and history: My Lady of the North (1904); A Sword of the Old Frontier (1905); Bob Hampton of Placer (1906); Historic Illinois (1905); Beth Norvell (1907); The Great Plains (1907); Prisoners of Chance (1908); The Last Voyage of the Donna Isabel (1908); My Lady of the South (1909). Many of these have been credited among the "six best sellers," and received high praise both at home and abroad.

== Family ==
In 1887, Parrish was married to Miss Mary A. Hammon, of Clarkson, Nebraska, and four children were born unto this union, two of whom survived to adulthood, namely: Robert Arthur, a cadet at St. John's Military Academy, Delafield, Wisconsin; and Philip Hammon, of Lynch, Nebraska. Parrish was divorced in 1899. On August 6, 1902, he married Rose I. Tyrell of Kewanee.

== Later life ==
Beginning in 1904, Parrish made his home at Kewanee, in the old family house at 235 South Chestnut Street, which was built in 1859. He served as one of the directors of the Commercial Club, was leading knight of the local Elks Lodge, and was a frequent speaker at public meetings throughout Illinois.

On August 9, 1923, he died at his home at Kewanee.

== Other works ==
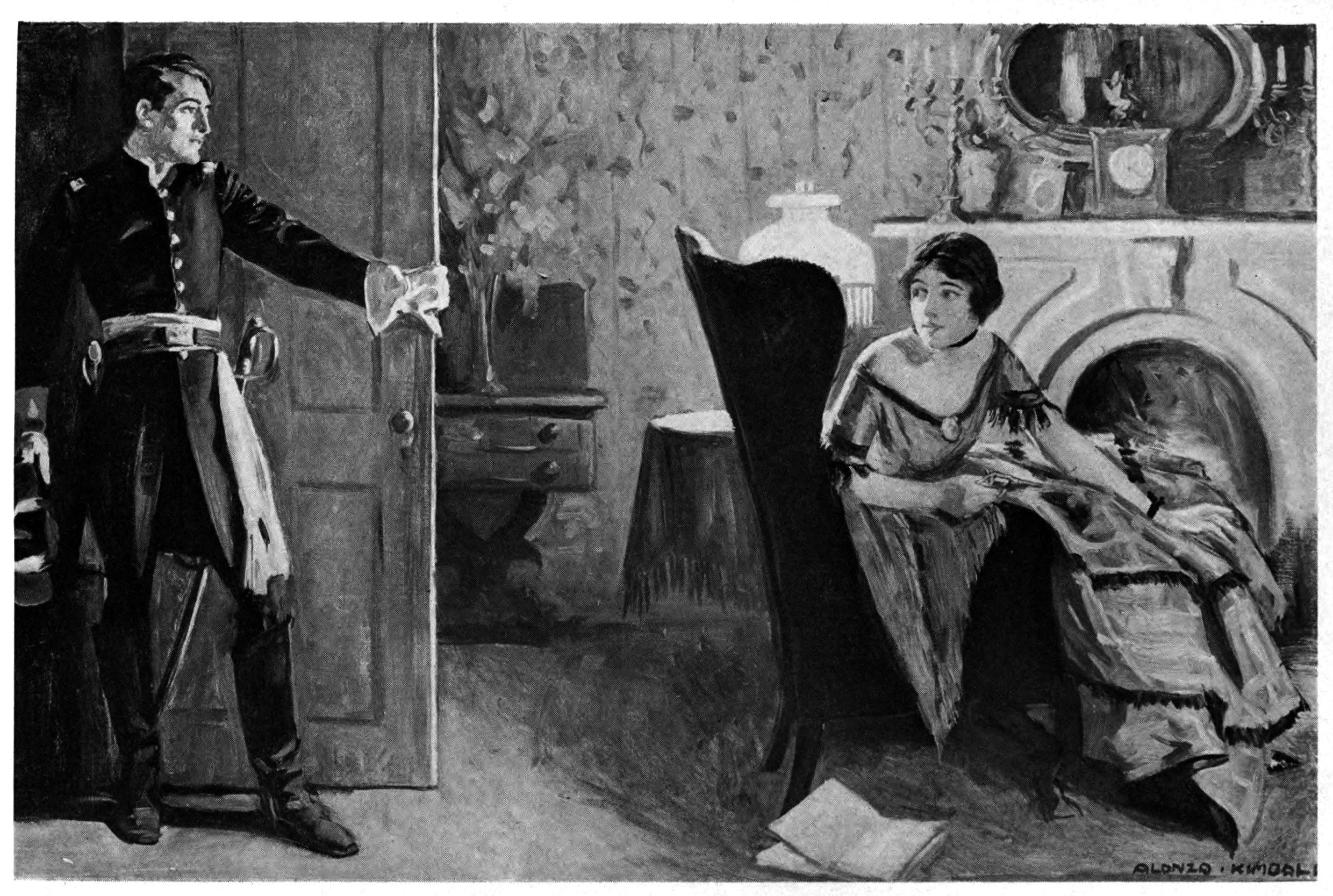
Illustration in The Red Mist: A Tale of Civil Strife (1914); reproduced from original painting by Alonzo Myron Kimball

- Keith of the Border: A Tale of the Plains (1910)
- My Lady of Doubt (1911)
- Love under Fire (1911)
- Molly McDonald (1912)
- Gordon Craig, Soldier of Fortune (1912)
- The Red Mist: A Tale of Civil Strife (1914)
- Beyond the Frontier: A Romance of Early Days in the Middle West (1915)
- The Devil's Own: A Romance of the Black Hawk War (1917)
- The Strange Case of Cavendish (1918)
- Wolves of the Sea (1918)
- The Case and the Girl (1922)
