= Max Michelson =

American imagist poet (1880–1953)

Max Michelson (1880–1953) was an American, imagist poet closely associated with Harriet Monroe and Poetry magazine.

== Life and career ==
Michelson was a childhood immigrant to America from Lithuania and settled in Chicago, working as a furrier. Later, in 1920 he moved to Seattle, 'soon after his arrival there, a mental hospital had to be his refuge' and there he was to stay until he died, in obscurity, in 1953.

Michelson, in addition to becoming an Imagist poet, reviewed poetry for the noted Poetry magazine. Harriet Monroe, the editor thereof said of Michelson 'he was a fine poet, a fine artist, offering deep searching in the beauty and mystery of life, always with a sure touch upon his finely tuned instrument, poetic rhythms of accurately responsive beauty, ' a furrier whose exquisite sensibility transcended the demands of his trade, and finding Michelson's delicate talent, quiet presence, helpful in the office routine and his judgement of new poets, suggestive'. Monroe, later, included five of Michelson's early poems in her 1918 'New Poetry - an anthology' and published in Poetry his 'The Tired Woman' - a ' present day myth play. Michelson's Imagist poem 'Midnight' was included in William Pratt's acclaimed anthology of Imagist poetry, ' The Imagist Poem - Modern Poetry in Miniature, 1963.

== See also ==
- The Extant Poetry and Prose of Max Michelson, Imagist
- 'The Tired Woman' a present-day myth play. (1918)
