= Their Mad Moment =

1931 film

- Directed by: Chandler Sprague; Hamilton MacFadden
- Written by: Lajos Bíró; Leon Gordon; John Farrow; Paul Perez; Lynn Starling
- Based on: Basquerie by Eleanor Mercein Kelly
- Produced by: Al Rockett
- Starring: Dorothy Mackaill; Warner Baxter; ZaSu Pitts
- Cinematography: Daniel B. Clark; Arthur L. Todd
- Edited by: Alex Troffey
- Music by: Richard Fall
- Production company: Fox Film Corporation
- Distributed by: Fox Film Corporation
- Release date: July 12, 1931
- Running time: 55 minutes
- Country: United States
- Language: English

Their Mad Moment is a 1931 American pre-Code comedy drama film directed by Chandler Sprague and starring Dorothy Mackaill, Warner Baxter and ZaSu Pitts. An uncredited Hamilton MacFadden also directed some scenes. It is based on the 1927 novel Basquerie by Eleanor Mercein Kelly. A Spanish-language version Mi último amor was also produced.

== Plot ==
American Suzanne Stanley, short of money, takes her stepdaughter Emily to Biarritz in order to find her a wealthy husband. She pushes her towards the dull Englishman Sir Harry Congers, but Emily is drawn instead to a poor Basque boatman Esteban. She agrees to go with him to the mountains to meet his family, intending to live romantically for a few days to compensate for a lifetime with Sir Harry. She knows she cannot cope with the harsh, peasant life in the mountains, and slips away to Biarritz. He reappears on the day of the wedding and takes her away on a yacht for England, revealing that he has made a fortune in America.

== Cast ==
- Dorothy Mackaill as Emily Stanley
- Warner Baxter as Esteban Cristera
- ZaSu Pitts as Miss Dibbs
- Nance O'Neil as Grand Mere
- Lawrence Grant as Sir Harry Congers
- Leon Janney as Narcio
- John St. Polis as Hotel Manager
- Nella Walker as Suzanne Stanley
- Mary Doran as Stancia
