= Harriet Monroe =

American poet and editor

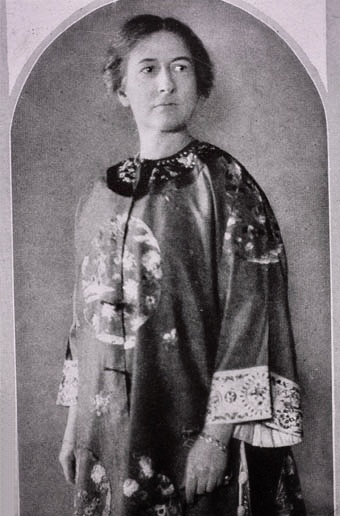
- Monroe in 1920
- Born: December 23, 1860; Chicago, Illinois, U.S.
- Died: September 26, 1936 (aged 75); Arequipa, Peru
- Education: Georgetown Visitation Preparatory School
- Occupations: Editor of Poetry magazine; Poet
- Relatives: John Wellborn Root (brother-in-law)
- Writing career
- Language: English

Harriet Monroe (December 23, 1860 – September 26, 1936) was an American editor, scholar, literary critic, poet, and patron of the arts. She was the founding publisher and long-time editor of Poetry magazine, which she established in 1912. As a supporter of the poets Wallace Stevens, Ezra Pound, H. D., T. S. Eliot, William Carlos Williams, Carl Sandburg, Max Michelson and others, Monroe played an important role in the development of modern poetry. Her correspondence with early twentieth century poets provides a wealth of information on their thoughts and motives.

== Early life and education ==
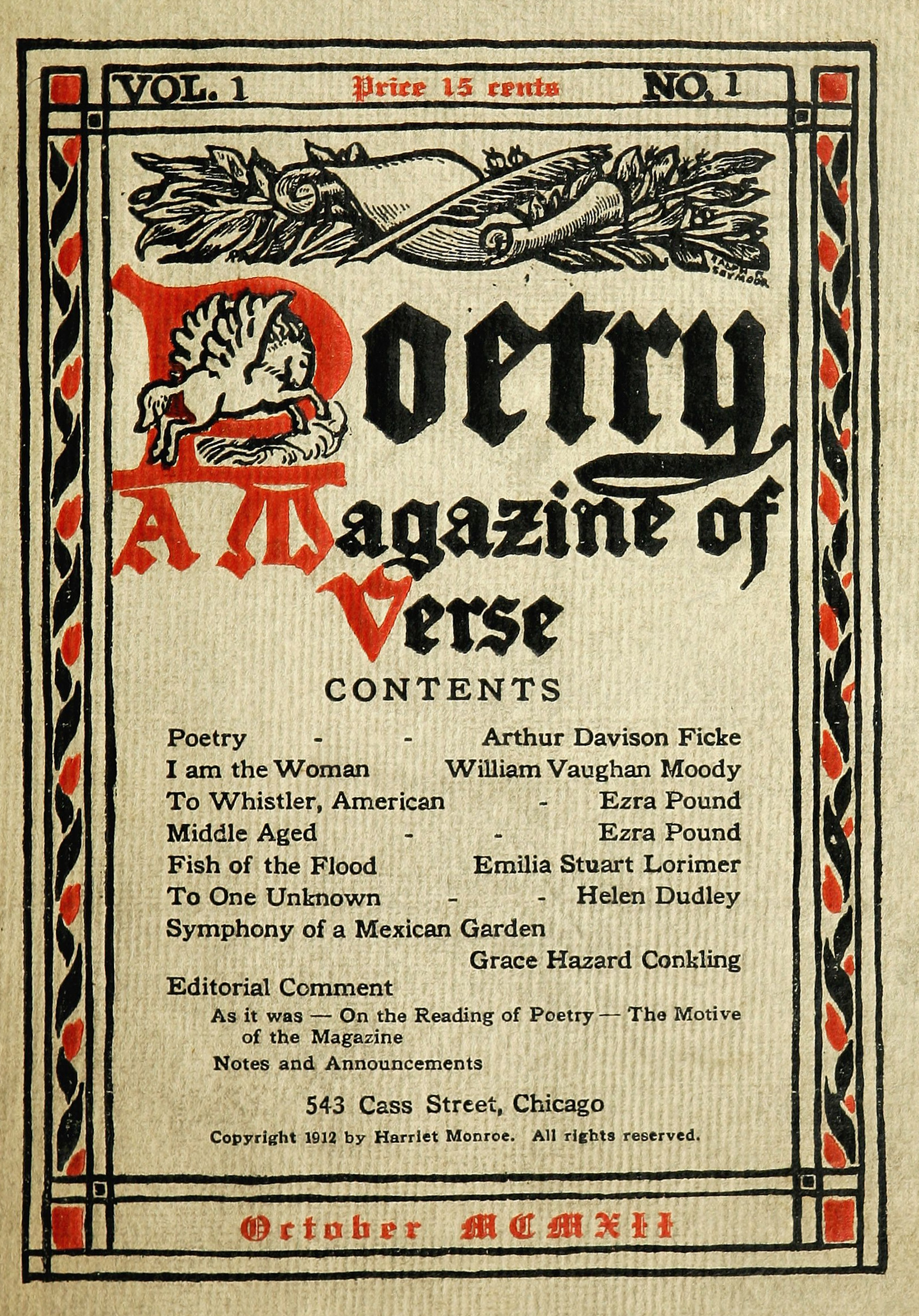
The October 1912 issue of Poetry magazine

Monroe was born in Chicago, Illinois. She read at an early age; her father, a lawyer, had a large library that provided refuge from domestic discord. In her autobiography, A Poet's Life: Seventy Years in a Changing World, published two years after her death, Monroe recalls: "I started in early with Shakespeare, Byron, Shelley, with Dickens and Thackeray; and always the book-lined library gave me a friendly assurance of companionship with lively and interesting people, gave me friends of the spirit to ease my loneliness."

== Career ==
=== Early writing ===
In 1879, Monroe graduated from the Visitation Academy located in the Georgetown section of Washington, D.C. Her mentor in writing was Mary Paulina Finn, a nun and writer. Sr. Finn published books, plays, and poems as M.S. Pine. Monroe was later recognized as a talented author for her age. Her prose published in 1899 in the Atlantic Monthly, The "Grand Canyon of the Colorado", was considered better poetry than her most notable poem, I love my life.

Driven by fears of posthumous anonymity, Monroe proclaimed after graduation her determination to become "great and famous" as a poet or playwright. In the Dictionary of Literary Biography, Judith Paterson quoted her as saying, "I cannot remember when to die without leaving some memorable record did not seem to me a calamity too terrible to be borne." She afterward devoted herself to literary work. In her biography, Monroe wrote, 'I have sense of consecration that made me think I would prefer art to life'.

Though Century magazine published her poem, "With a Copy of Shelley", in 1889, she became disillusioned by the limited earnings available for poets, saying: "The minor painter or sculptor was honored with large annual awards in our greatest cities, while the minor poet was a joke of the paragraphers, subject to the popular prejudice that his art thrived best on starvation in a garret." She became a freelance correspondent to the Chicago Tribune, and was commissioned to write a commemorative ode to be read at the opening ceremonies for the World's Fair commemorating the 400th anniversary of Columbus' first landing in the Americas.,

=== Poetry magazine ===
Monroe's financial hardships were alleviated after she sued the New York World for publishing her Columbian ode without her consent and she was awarded $5,000 in a settlement. With help from publisher Hobart Chatfield-Taylor, Monroe convinced one hundred prominent Chicago business leaders to sponsor the magazine Poetry by each committing to fifty dollars for a five-year subscription. The $5,000, coupled with her own settlement, was enough to launch the magazine on September 23, 1912, while upholding its promise to contributors of adequate payment for all published work.

Monroe was editor for its first two years without salary, while simultaneously working as an art critic for the Chicago Tribune. By 1914, the magazine work became too much for her to accomplish while working other jobs, so she resigned from the Tribune and accepted a salary of fifty dollars per month from the magazine. For more than ten years she maintained herself on this stipend, raising it to one hundred dollars per month in 1925. Her extensive papers and correspondence as editor of Poetry magazine, illuminate the authorial process and the birth of modern poetry.

Don Share, who became editor of Poetry in 2013, writes that Monroe seemed to have a "sixth sense" about the poetry she published. Monroe, herself, wrote and preferred poems rooted in 19th century tradition, but in her magazine, "that countervailing sixth sense allowed her to make literary history. She invented a box, you could say — and promptly set to work thinking outside it. Her magazine was, therefore, like she was: unpredictable, difficult, and infuriating," but she never wavered in her assessment of progressive American culture as a democratic triumph.

== Later life and death ==
Monroe continued to edit Poetry magazine until she died in Arequipa, Peru on September 26, 1936, at age 75. She was on her way to climb Machu Picchu, and the high altitudes reportedly triggered a cerebral hemorrhage, which caused her death.

Monroe was a member of the Eagle's Nest Art Colony in Ogle County, Illinois, and is mentioned in Erik Larson's The Devil in the White City. In 2011, Monroe was inducted into the Chicago Literary Hall of Fame.

== Family ==
Monroe was the sister-in-law of Chicago architect John Wellborn Root, and wrote his biography.

== Works ==
- Columbian Ode composed for the opening of the World's Columbian Exposition, with George Whitefield Chadwick (1892)
- Valeria and other Poems (1892)
- John Wellborn Root: A Study of His Life and Work (1896)
- The Passing Show - Five Modern Plays in Verse (1903)
- Dance of the Seasons (1911)
- You and I - Poems (1914)
- The New Poetry: Anthology of 20th Century Verse (1921)
- Poets And Their Art (1926)
- A Poet's Life - Seventy Years in a Changing World (1938)
