= Agnes Repplier =

American essayist

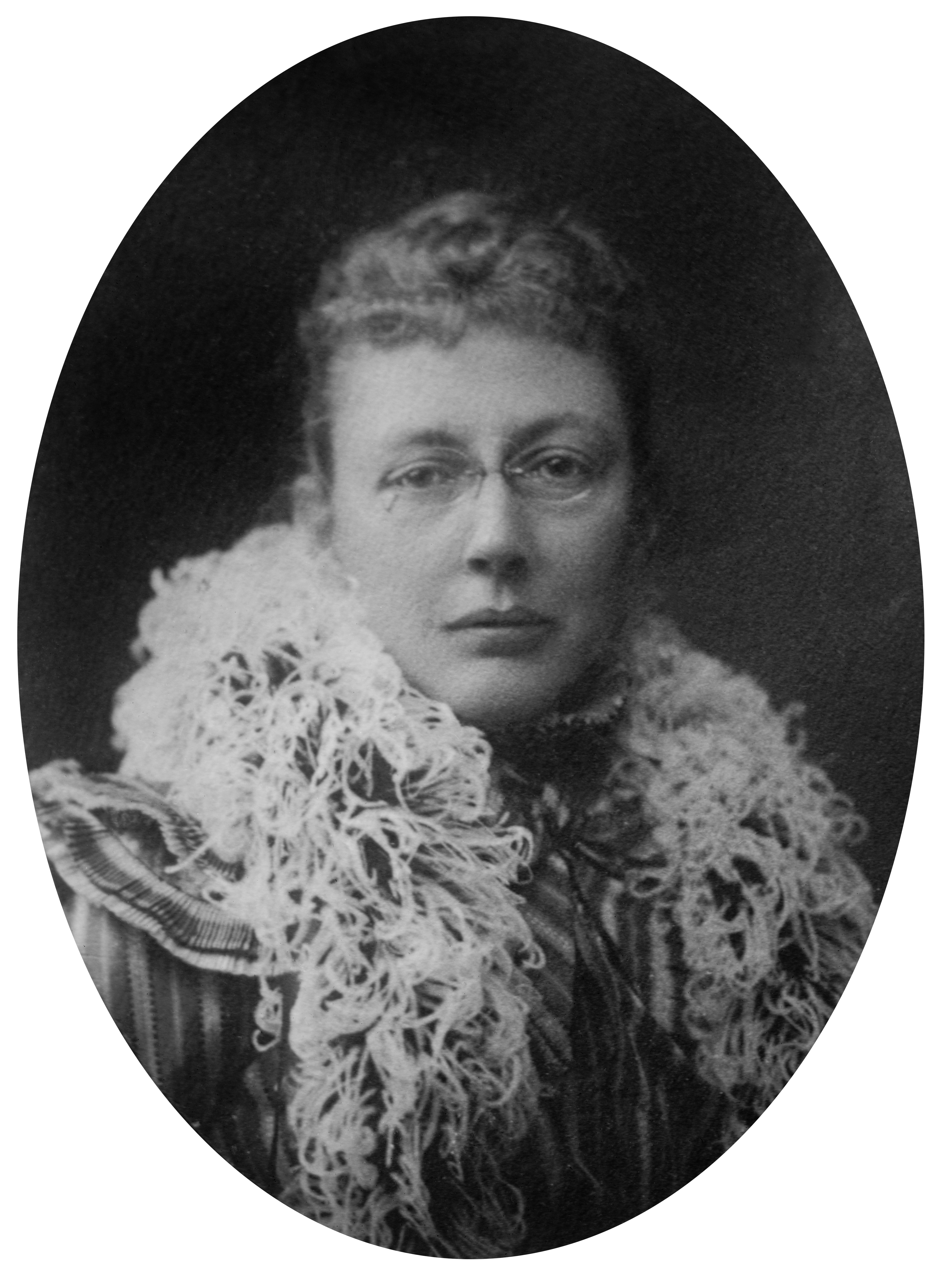
- Born: Philadelphia
- Died: December 15, 1950 (aged 95); Philadelphia
- Resting place: Saint John the Evangelist church, Philadelphia
- Writing career
- Notable works: In Our Convent Days (1905), Points of Friction (1920)

Agnes Repplier (April 1, 1855 – December 15, 1950) was an American essayist.

== Early years ==
She was born in Philadelphia in 1855, of French and German extraction, and was educated at the Convent of the Sacred Heart, Eden Hall at Torresdale, Philadelphia, and later at the Agnes Irwin School. Repplier was reportedly expelled from two schools for "independent behaviour" and illiterate until the age of ten. She received mentoring in writing by a nun who was herself a noted writer, Mary Paulina Finn, who published books, poetry and plays under the pseudonym M. S. Pine.

== Career ==
Despite her school experiences, she became one of America's chief representatives of the discursive essay, displaying wide reading and apt quotation. Her writings contain literary criticism as well as comments on contemporary life. These characteristics were already apparent in the first essay which she contributed to the Atlantic Monthly (April 1886), entitled “Children, Past and Present.”

Repplier's earliest national publications appeared in 1881 in Catholic World. Although she did write several biographies and some fiction, early in her career she decided to concentrate on essays, and for 50 years she enjoyed a national reputation. She was awarded honorary degrees by the University of Pennsylvania (1902), Notre Dame (1911), Yale (1925), and Columbia University (1927). She was elected as a member to the American Philosophical Society in 1928. Repplier received the Siena Medal from Theta Phi Alpha in 1939.

== Personal life ==
Repplier was a devout Catholic, and had a conservative's outlook on the issues of the day. She was an advocate of feminism and opponent of American neutrality during World War One, though an opponent of radicals and activists. Living and dying in Philadelphia, she also spent time in Europe.

Edward Wagenknecht described her, in 1946, as "our dean of essayists".

== Selected works ==
- Philadelphia: The Place and the People (1898)
- The Fireside Sphinx (1901)
- In Our Convent Days (1905)
- The Cat (1912)
- Germany and Democracy (1914; with J. William White)
- The Promise of the Bell: Christmas in Philadelphia (1924)
- To Think of Tea! (1932)
- In Pursuit of Laughter (1936) a historical study of types of humor

Essay collections

- Books and Men (1888)
- Points of View (1891)
- Essays in Miniature (1892)
- Essays in Idleness (1893)
- In the Dozy Hours and Other Papers (1894)
- Varia (1897)
- Compromises (1904)
- A Happy Half-Century and Other Essays (1908)
- Americans and Others (1912)
- Counter-Currents (1916)
- Points of Friction (1920)
- Under Dispute (1924)
- Times and Tendencies (1931)
- Eight Decades: Essays and Episodes (1937)

Biographical studies

- J. William White, M.D.: A Biography (1919)
- Père Marquette: Priest, Pioneer and Adventurer (1929) (Jacques Marquette)
- Mère Marie of the Ursulines: A Study in Adventure (1931) (Marie de l'Incarnation)
- Junípero Serra: Pioneer Colonist of California (1933)
- Agnes Irwin: A Biography (1934)

Short stories

- "The Last Pages in the Journal of Eve de la Tour d'Arraine," The Catholic World (1882)
- "A Story of Nuremberg," The Catholic World (1884)

Selected articles

- "The Good Humor of the Saints," The Catholic World (1882)
- "An Apostle of Doubt," The Catholic World (1884)
- "Heaven in Recent Fiction," The Catholic World (1885)
- "Falsehood as a Moral Agent," The Catholic World (1885)
- "English Voices on the French Revolution," The Catholic World (1885)
- "English Hymns," The Catholic World (1886)
- "Christmas Carols," The Catholic World (1887)
- "Education," The Atlantic Monthly (1922)
