= Marian Canney =

American educator (1921–2019)

Marian Canney (née Gallagher, Jan. 18, 1921 – Sept. 9, 2019) was a faculty member at Georgetown Visitation Preparatory School. She was also well known for her visibility as widow of a Korean war soldier, John J. Canney Jr.

== Early life and education ==
Canney was born Marian Elisabeth Gallagher and lived in Washington, D.C., with her parents and two sisters. She started Georgetown Visitation Preparatory School, first graduating from high school in 1938 before continuing on to their junior college and graduating from there in 1940.

Canney attended Trinity College before her marriage, then returned to Georgetown University for a graduate degree in theology and philosophy.

== Career ==
In 1971, Canney joined the faculty at Georgetown Visitation Preparatory School, the school she attended growing up. She became the Chair of the Religion Department. She assisted the head of the school during her career as well.

She retired in 2017.

== Marriage and widowhood ==
Canney married Captain John Joseph Canney Jr., of Cambridge, Massachusetts, in January 1943 in Washington, D.C. John J. Canney, who was five years Marian's senior, was killed in action on November 28, 1950, during the Korean War. The Navy Cross was awarded to him after his death.

== Influences ==
Canney influenced authors Anne B. Keating, Joseph Hargitai, Joseph R. Hargitai, who wrote The Wired Professor: A Guide to the World Wide Web in College Instruction.
