= Gabriel Richard Building =

- Weil and Company – Gabriel Richard Building
- U.S. National Register of Historic Places
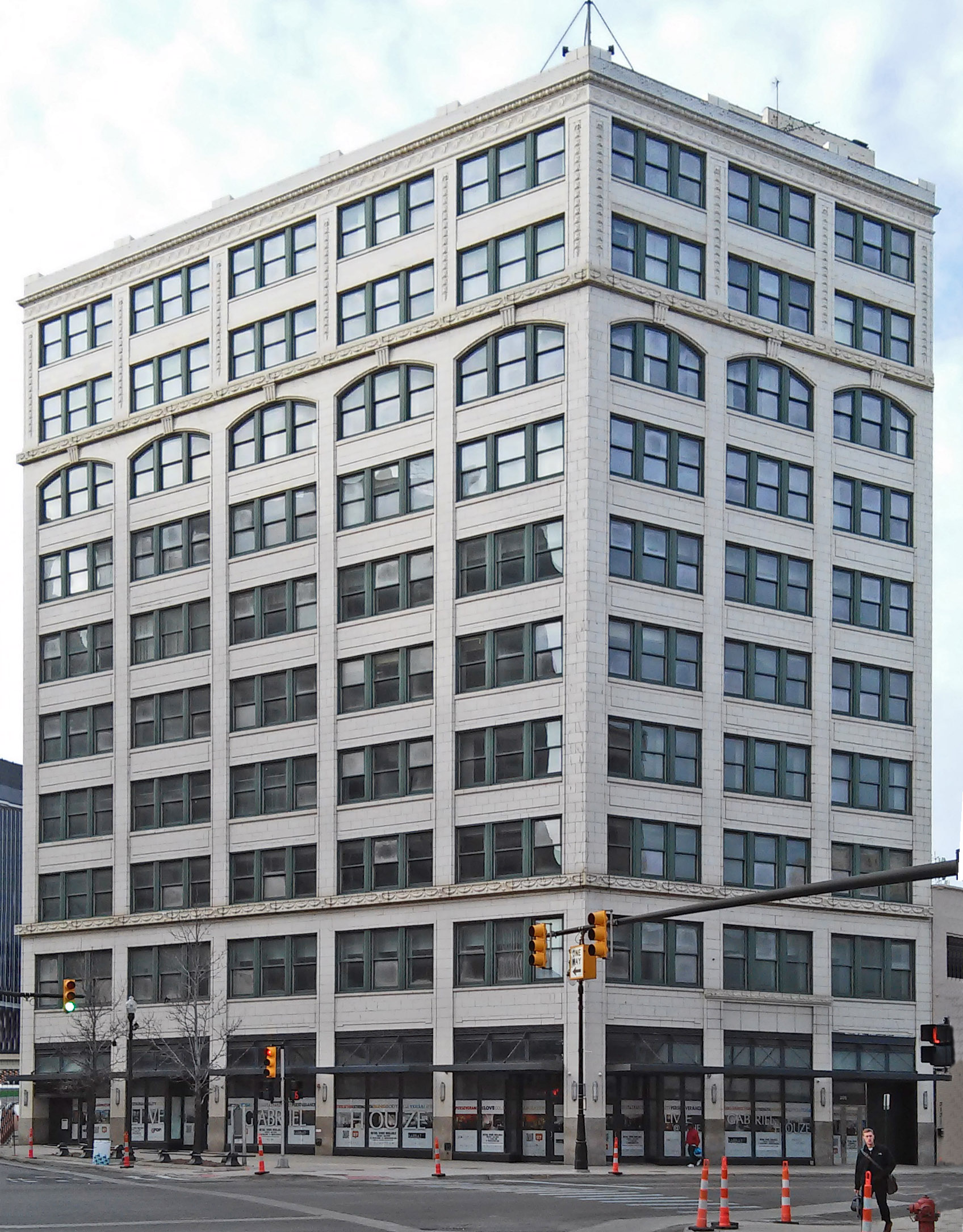
- Gabriel Richard Building, 2017
- Interactive map
- Location: 305 Michigan Ave. Detroit, Michigan
- Coordinates: 42°19′53″N 83°3′6″W
- Built: 1914
- Architect: Marshall & Fox
- Architectural style: Chicago Style, Neo-Classical
- NRHP reference No.: 100000604
- Added to NRHP: January 31, 2017

The Gabriel Richard Building, also known as the Weil and Company Building, is high-rise located at 305 Michigan Avenue in Downtown Detroit, Michigan. It was listed on the National Register of Historic Places in 2017. The building will open as a residential apartment building known as the Gabriel Houze in late 2017.

== History ==
In 1897, Moe C Weil moved from Cincinnati to Detroit and opened a furniture store known as Weil and Company. Their first store was downtown on Woodward Avenue. In 1914, Weil entered into an agreement with David Stott and the Stott Realty Company to lease this building, which Stott would construct specifically for their use. Stott hired the Chicago architecture firm of Marshall & Fox to design the building. Construction began in 1914, and was completed in 1915. Weil and Company opened their new store in this building in November 1915. The Stott Realty Company retained ownership, with Weil leasing the building.

Moe Weil died in 1920, leaving the store to his wife Hattie. Hattie died in 1930 and left the company to her son Victor and daughter Florence, with the stipulation that Victor continue to run the business. Victor, however, died in 1943 while serving in the United States Air Corps, and Weil and Company soon went out of business.

In 1945, the Stott Realty Company sold the building to the nearby St. Aloysius Roman Catholic Church. The church renamed the building the Gabriel Richard Building, after pioneering Detroiter Father Gabriel Richard. In 1948, the church turned the building over to the Roman Catholic Archdiocese of Detroit for use as offices. The church was in an expansion phase after World War II, growing from 800,000 Catholics in 1945 to 1.3 million in 1960. The Catholic Family Center was one of the first organizations located in the Gabriel Richard building, and much of the remainder of the building was leased to other secular tenants, including a credit association, law office, and Michigan Bell Telephone. As the Archdiocese grew, the number of Catholic offices in the building increased until by 1968 the Archdiocese occupied all of the upper floors, including the Parish Life and Services Department, Christian Services Department, Catholic Youth Organization, the Communications Department, and the Information Technology Department. In 1976, the building became home to the Catholic High School League Hall of Fame, and it came to be home to a television studio in the 1980s.

However, the number of Catholics declined starting in the 1970s, and in 2015 the Archdiocese moved its offices to a smaller building and sold the Gabriel Richard Building. Developer Joe Barbat purchased the building. Barbat plans to undertake a $6.5 million renovation to turn the building into about 110 multifamily residential units. The building will open as a residential apartment building known as the 'Gabriel Houze in late 2017.

== Description ==
The Gabriel Richard Building is a ten-and-a-half-story tall Chicago Style commercial building with Classical Revival decorative elements. The building is clad with white terra cotta, and has a tripartite overall design, with a two-and-a-half-story tall base, a six-story tall main section, and a two-story tall top with surmounting parapet wall. The building faces two main streets: Michigan Avenue and Washington Boulevard. The main facades are three and five bays wide, with bays separated by vertical piers and triple window openings on each floor. The facades have identical terra cotta Classical Revival decorations such as garlands egg and dart molding and keystones.

The two-and-a-half-story tall base of the building contains one-and-a-half-story tall storefronts with newer aluminum and glass-framed windows installed and canopies overhead. The center bay on the Michigan Avenue side has a projecting cornice across the top of the storefront opening. The right-hand bay contains the entrance to the upper floors, with another building entrance in the left-hand bay. The Washington Avenue elevation also has entryways in the left- and right-hand bays. The second floor above the storefronts on each side contains three one-over-one double-hung windows.

The central six-story section of the building is demarcated by projecting bands at the sill lines of the third and ninth floor windows. The eighth-floor window openings have segmental-arch heads which emphasize the top of the section. The top two floors contain more decorative elements. The piers between the bays contain a raised vertical line of flowers down the center of the pier. The top of the building is decorated with wave and egg and dart molding. The piers end in a terra cotta merlon extending above the wall.

The interior of the building has been remodeled multiple times. The first floor contains commercial spaces and an entrance lobby to the upper floors. The lobby has marble tile floors and wainscot with painted walls above. The upper floors contain corridors with offices. The basement contains an unused staircase with a small section of metal railing supported by fluted newel posts resembling classical columns which is apparently original to the building.
