= SBP (nonprofit organization) =

American disaster relief organization

- SBP logo
- Abbreviation: SBP
- Named after: St. Bernard Parish, Louisiana
- Formation: March 2006; 20 years ago
- Founder: Zack Rosenburg; Liz McCartney
- Founded at: St. Bernard Parish, Louisiana
- Legal status: 501(c)3 non-profit organization
- Headquarters: New Orleans
- Board of directors: Jacqueline Alexander, JD; Francis Bouchard; Trevor Colhoun; Scott Couvillon; Keith Daly; Pete Forlenza; Craig Fundum; Mike Goss; Mary Jones; Elie Khoury; Courtenay Laroche; Ann Limberg; M. Cleland Powell III; Zack Rosenburg; John Solon, CPA; Julie Tyson; Stefan Wilson
- Key people: Zack Rosenburg, CEO; Liz McCartney, COO; Sutton Hibbert, CFO; Reese May, Chief Strategy and Innovation Officer; Elizabeth Eglé, Chief Development Officer
- Affiliations: AmeriCorps; Toyota
- Budget: 25,049,319 (2018)
- Website: sbpusa.org
- Formerly called: St. Bernard Project

SBP (formerly the St. Bernard Project) is a nonprofit, disaster relief organization. After temporarily volunteering in St. Bernard Parish, Louisiana after Hurricane Katrina, Liz McCartney and Zack Rosenburg returned permanently in March 2006 and founded the project. The organization eventually expanded to include offices in New Orleans and Baton Rouge in Louisiana, Joplin, Missouri, Columbia, South Carolina, New Jersey, New York, and West Virginia. By August 2022, SBP's national impact included assistance to 5,500 families, including the rebuilding of over 1,200 homes (as of 2017), including 600 in New Orleans. They have collaborated extensively with Toyota (for organizational expertise) and AmeriCorps (for its pool of volunteers). As a result of its accomplishments, the organization and its founders have been recognized by Senator Mary Landrieu, CNN, and President Barack Obama.

== Creation ==
The organization was founded in March 2006 by Liz McCartney and Zack Rosenburg, who previously lived and worked in Washington, DC. They came from a charitable background: Rosenburg's law office represented indigents and McCartney ran a nonprofit group, the Capitol Hill Computer Corner, which trained the economically disadvantaged in computer skills. They first came to New Orleans, along with McCartney's mother, in January 2006 to offer their help for a month towards relief efforts, and ended up in St. Bernard Parish. All 27,000 of the zone's houses had been damaged or destroyed, and Rosenburg resolved to come back. After going home and tying up loose ends, they returned with plans of building a community center, a camp for kids, and a tool-sharing co-op, but soon realized that the local population had more urgent needs. A local repairman, Frank White (whose business had been destroyed in the storm) trained the couple in construction and allowed them to use his space for their nascent organization in exchange for their help in repairing it. While rebuilding homes with their growing skills, McCartney used her history as a grant writer to seek foundation and corporate funding, and the couple toured the nation presenting the program to potential donors and volunteers.

== Mission ==
SBP's stated mission is to shrink the time between disaster and full recovery by ensuring that disaster-impacted citizens and communities recover in a prompt, efficient and predictable manner, reducing "construction time by 30 percent and costs by 10 to 15 percent." To do this, the project uses an "Under One Roof" model, incorporating the many facets of a volunteer-based rebuilding program into one entity. The project recruits and trains volunteers, provides skilled site managers, provides health services, and coordinates fundraising. SBP also started a Center for Wellness and Mental Health that provided mental health services for citizens who are unable to pay for it elsewhere. By its fifth anniversary, the organization had expanded to include rebuilding efforts in Baton Rouge, Louisiana; Joplin, Missouri; Columbia, South Carolina; New Jersey; New York; and West Virginia. As new disasters arise, SBP re-assesses to place offices in zones with greatest need, and each office has a corresponding executive director. As of 2020, those directors are:

- Andy Stofleth - Bahamas
- Dulcie Shepherd – New Orleans, Louisiana
- Thomas Corley – New York
- Edgardo Maldonado – Puerto Rico
- Vincent Gialanella – New Jersey
- Glenn Goodwin – South Carolina
- Tommy Ray – Baton Rouge, Louisiana
- Mark Smith – Houston, Texas

The project has three distinct programs, all of which target the specific needs of different groups in the community: the Rebuilding Program, the Affordable Rental/First Time Homeowners Program, and the Veteran's Initiative.

=== Rebuild ===
The Owner-Occupied Rebuilding Program is a volunteer-driven program that evaluates the need of homeowners and then either supplies skilled labor to help them rebuild their homes, or, if the homeowner cannot afford them on their own, provides building materials paid for by donations. The Rebuilding Program can rebuild a home in 12 weeks, for around US$75,000.

=== Opportunity Housing Program ===
The Affordable Rental/First Time Homeowners Program aims to provide housing options to senior and disabled residents of SBP who face 50% increases in rental rates since hurricane Katrina.

=== Veteran's Initiative ===
SBP's veterans programs are focused on addressing three problems: high unemployment rate among men and women who have served in the US armed forces; affordable housing crisis; and high incidence of blighted and vacant properties in the New Orleans area. By hiring and training veterans in residential construction and paying them fair and livable wages and benefits, SBP can both increase its workforce to rebuild homes, and improve blighted and vacant properties and neighborhoods.

The Good Work Good Pay Program utilizes a trained workforce to build or rebuild affordable homes and to stabilize blighted, vacant, and disaster-impacted communities. These employees primarily complete electric, plumbing and carpentry work for the Rebuilding Program and Opportunity Housing Program, thereby minimizing SBP's need for subcontractors, speeding and reducing the cost of projects.

== Accomplishments ==
By June 2007, SBP had completed more than 30 homes, and had 20 more projects in the works. That same month, the New Orleans Shell Shockers' players, coaches, and staff volunteered with the organization's building efforts. In October 2007, Boeing made a $10000 donation to be used between SBP and the Beacon of Hope Research Center. By September 2008, their annual budget had reached $2.7 million in donations, and they managed a staff of 32, many of which were affiliated with AmeriCorps. Additionally, they had completed a total of 145, and 36 projects were underway. In May 2009, SPB hosted its third annual Women's Rebuild Week, an event started in 2006. Over 200 women pledged to donate time to reconstruction efforts. In October 2009, the organization hosted its inaugural Nuns' Build Week, inviting women from the Women Religious group first established in New Orleans in 1727. In 2010, organization began to provide assistance to fishermen affected by what came to be known as the Deepwater Horizon oil spill.

President Barack Obama spoke at Xavier University in August 2010 on the fifth anniversary of Hurricane Katrina. Highlighting the "dedicated public servants" of New Orleans, he remarked of SPB that "this endeavor has drawn volunteers from across the country to rebuild hundreds of homes throughout St. Bernard Parish and the Lower Ninth Ward." The following week, Oprah Winfrey announced the traveling company of The Color Purple would be raising funds for the organization along with the novel's author, Alice Walker. Shortly thereafter, SBP and similar disaster relief organizations drew criticism for being complicit by not speaking out against the "blood relative" ordinance, forbidding homeowners to rent to persons who were not blood relatives, which critics asserted was an act of de facto racism against Jews and blacks. SBP denied the allegations, asserting that they were not an advocacy group and that 30 percent of the homes they had rebuilt had been those of African-Americans.

In March 2011, the cast of Days of Our Lives volunteered with SPB as part of their promotional book tour for Days of our Lives 45 Years: A Celebration in Photos.

Toyota announced on June 29, 2011, the launch of a national program to donate its Toyota Production System expertise towards nonprofit organizations with goal of improving their operations, extending their reach, and increasing their impact. By September, less than three months later, SPB reported that their home rebuilds had been reduced from 12 to 18 weeks, to 6 weeks. Additionally, employing Toyota methods (like kaizen) had reduced construction errors by 50 percent. The company included SBP among its first 20 community organizations, along with AmeriCorps.

American Standard Brands donated over 1,500 plumbing fixtures and accessories to SBP in 2011. Over the years, SBP has partnered with other nonprofits and charities, including David's Cure, Tuesday's Children, The American Widow Project, and the Risk and Insurance Management Society.

The American Institute of Architects announced in June 2013 at CGI America (an annual event of the Clinton Global Initiative) the creation of "Designing Recovery," a design contest in partnership with the charities Make It Right, SBP, and Architecture for Humanity. Sponsored by Dow Building Solutions, a total of $30,000 in prize money was divided equally among three winning designs in New Orleans, Louisiana, Joplin, Missouri, and New York City. Entrants submitted single-family housing designs with the objective of "improving the quality, diversity and resiliency of the housing in each community". Organizers made the portfolio of designs (even from non-winners) available to communities recovering from natural disasters.

Zurich Insurance Group began a relationship with SBP at its Zurich Classic golf tournament in New Orleans. Over the next five years, more than 1,000 Zurich employees, customers, brokers, and distributors volunteered with SBP to rebuild homes in New Orleans, Staten Island and Joplin, until in April 2014, the company announced that its Z Zurich Foundation would give SBP a $3 million grant over three years. The grant would go towards creating a Disaster Resilience and Recovery Lab—a disaster relief model that propagates best practices learned in New Orleans after Katrina to communities affected by future disasters. Additionally, in response to the increasing number of deadly storms between 2010 and 2013, Farmers Insurance began "researching a model that municipalities across the United States could use to significantly reduce the time required for residential recovery." Teaming with SBP, the result was the Disaster Recovery Playbook, an evolving online resource. Since the guide's initial creation, AmeriCorps has been brought onto the team.

In September 2015, SBP broke ground its new headquarters, moving from Chalmette to a 25,000-square-foot former salvage company on Toulouse Street as part of a $7.2 million relocation effort. The building is also serves as the national hub for the Disaster Resilience and Recovery Lab. The organization continues to have satellite offices in New York and New Jersey. The organization moved into its new space in May 2016, leasing their previous building to organizations such as the Trust for Public Land and Louisiana Green Corps. Along with the move, the organization officially shortened its name from St. Bernard Project to SBP, as its work had spread beyond St. Bernard Parish, reaching throughout New Orleans and eventually the country.

After a family spent five years displaced after Hurricane Sandy, J.F. Kiely Construction Co. partnered with SBP in August 2016, to get the family back in their home. Kiely team members volunteered a combined 260 hours towards the project, and the homeowner and his son were able to move back into their home on June 28, 2017. SBP maintains a New York office in the Rockaways where they maintain a "Wall of Waiting," featuring homes that need extensive work in areas such as Queens, Brooklyn, and Staten Island.

After the destruction of Hurricane Harvey in August 2017, Toyota Motor North America, announced a collaboration with Toyota Financial Services, The Friedkin Group, Gulf States Toyota and Toyota and Lexus dealers nationwide to offer a combined relief effort of more than $3 million to relief organizations, including SBP. J. J. Watt, defensive end for the Houston Texans, raised an unexpected $37 million towards the relief efforts, and so consulted SBP and Team Rubicon for how to best spend the funds. Harvey Home Connect is an app by SBP that survivors can use to apply for assistance. SBP then compiles the necessary documentation to help complete an assistance package and deliver it to the right organization.

SBP first sent AmeriCorps members to Puerto Rico in October 2017, but by July 2018 it began a long-term recovery effort by canvassing neighborhoods and prioritizing homeowners based on their level of need. The organization has set the goal of repairing 100 homes in the first year.

== Media appearances ==
During season two of Retire My Room, makeover web series for retired seniors, SBP, Friends of Rockaway featured the bedroom remodels for two families who were victims of natural disasters. The episodes were posted in 2014. In the fall of 2016, Jonathan and Drew Scott of the Property Brothers filmed the program Brothers Take New Orleans, and competed in the renovation of a traditional "shotgun house" duplex in New Orleans that was built in 1904. The house's owner was displaced after damage caused by Hurricane Katrina; a fraudulent contractor then took her renovation money without completing the work. The home had been uninhabited for 11 years when the brothers worked with SBP to completely restore the home.

== Awards and accolades ==
- In 2007 McCartney and Rosenburg were included in Gambit's 40 under 40 list of successful young New Orleanians.
- On May 3, 2008, Senator Mary Landrieu presented McCartney and Rosenburg with the Heroes of the Storm Award.
- McCartney and Rosenburg received the Manhattan Institute, Social Entrepreneurship Award in 2008.
- On November 27, 2008, Liz McCartney and the St. Bernard Project were recognized for its efforts in a ceremony by CNN, titled CNN Heroes, by carrying home the Hero of the year award.
- On January 5, 2009, McCartney and Rosenburg were named Gambit's New Orleanians of the Year 2008.
- In July 2009, SBP was included among 50 companies that CityBusiness included among its 2009 Innovator of the Year honorees.

== See also ==
- Reconstruction of New Orleans
