= Eleanor Mercein Kelly =

American writer (1880–1968)

- Photograph taken in Louisville, 1933
- Born: Eleanor Royce Mercein; 30 August 1880; Milwaukee, Wisconsin, United States
- Died: 11 October 1968 (aged 88); Louisville, Kentucky, United States
- Occupations: Novelist, short story writer
- Spouse(s): Robert M. Kelly, Jr. (m. 1901–1926; his death)
- Writing career
- Genres: Romantic fiction, Biography, Travel
- Notable works: Kildares of Storm, Basquerie

Eleanor Mercein Kelly (August 30, 1880 – October 11, 1968) was an American writer of fiction and nonfiction. She wrote one biographical study, The Chronicle of a Happy Woman: Emily A. Davison (1928), but is best known for her romantic fiction, most of which was set in exotic locales. She was widely traveled, and used her travels as inspiration for her novels. Four of her stories were adapted to film and one on Broadway.

== Life and career ==
=== Early years ===
Kelly, daughter of Thomas Royce Mercein and Lucy Schley Mercein, was born into a prominent and wealthy Milwaukee family. Prior to high school, Kelly attended the Seventh Ward school in Milwaukee, where she won first place in sight reading and had the highest general average in the school.

=== Georgetown Visitation Monastery (High School Years) ===
For her high school years, Kelly's parents made the decision to send her to the Georgetown Visitation Preparatory School, a Roman Catholic boarding school in Washington D.C. She later showed her approval of this decision, and spoke of her parents' wisdom in sending her to a school which was "steeped in tradition and leisurely atmosphere, where predilection for writing...could have full play for expansion." She was mentored in writing by a nun who was herself a noted writer, Mary Paulina Finn, who published as M. S. Pine. Kelly later reminisced, "I used to spend long days under a rose bower writing. Often they brought my lunch out to me." In 1898, Kelly was graduated from the school with honors, the valedictorian of her class.

=== Move to Louisville ===
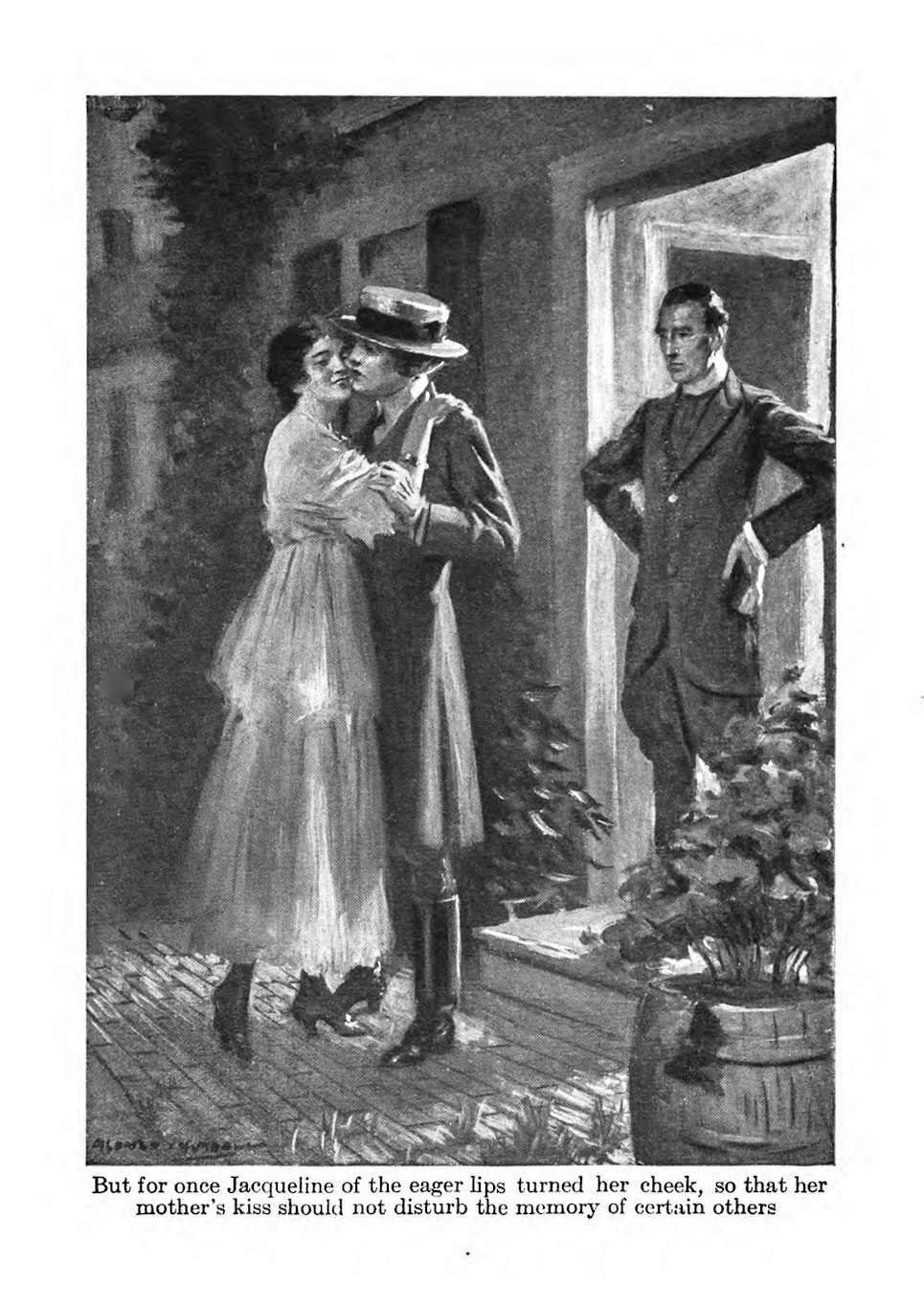
Frontispiece in 1916 edition of Kildares of Storm; image by Alonzo Myron Kimball

After her marriage to Robert M. Kelly in 1901, Kelly settled in Louisville, Kentucky. She later explained, "I dearly love Milwaukee, but I simply cannot write here." The Kentucky environment inspired her, and she furiously began to write. The result was three novels featuring Kentuckian characters and setting, titled Kildares of Storm (1916), Why Joan? (1918), and The Mansion House (1923). She had written one novel previously, Toya the Unlike (1913), but it was not well received by critics. Later, Kentucky's novelty wore off, and she turned to more exotic locales for inspiration and setting.

Kelly was the director of the Louisville Arts Club and held memberships in the Louisville Woman's Club, Colonial Dames of America, and the National Arts Club of New York.

=== Later life ===
In 1950, after years of penning mainly short stories, Kelly returned to novel writing with the book Richard Walden's Wife, a story partly based on family diaries. The next year, she released Proud Castle, a novel about the Magyars of Hungary. She died on October 11, 1968, in Louisville. She was cremated and buried in a family lot in Milwaukee.

== Writings ==
Eleanor Mercein Kelly wrote a total of fifteen books, including fourteen novels and one biographical study, in addition to numerous short stories published in magazines such as the Ladies Home Journal, Collier's, The Century Magazine, Munsey's Magazine, the Harper's Monthly, and The Saturday Evening Post.

=== List of known works ===
==== Fiction ====
- Toya the Unlike (1913)
- Kildares of Storm (1916)
- Why Joan? (1918)
- The Mansion House (1923)
- Basquerie (1927)
- The Book of Bette (1929)
- Arabesque (1930)
- Spanish Holiday (1930)
- Nacio, His Affairs (1931)
- Sea Change (1931)
- Sounding Harbors (1935)
- Mixed Company (1936)
- Richard Walden's Wife (1950)
- Proud Castle (1951)

==== Nonfiction ====
- The Chronicle of a Happy Woman: Emily A. Davison (1928)

==== Short stories ====
(This is an incomplete list.)

- "A Friend of Jimmie's" (1909) (McBride's Magazine) (Lippincott's Monthly Magazine)
- "The Girl Who Forgot" (1909) (McBride's Magazine) (Lippincott's Monthly Magazine)
- "Adventures of a Recluse" (1912) (McBride's Magazine) (Lippincott's Monthly Magazine)
- "The Head of the Family" (1915) (Munsey's Magazine)
- "Hunger" (1915) (The Century Magazine)
- "Atmosphere" (1916) (Munsey's Magazine)
- "La Bella Gina" (1926) (The Harper's Monthly)
- "Michaelmas Moon" (1934) (Saturday Evening Post)
- "Polonaise" (1935) (Saturday Evening Post)
- "Where But in England?" (1938) (Saturday Evening Post)

=== Adaptations of works ===
==== Film ====
Year	Title	Story based on	Notes
1918	Kildare of Storm	Kildares of Storm	Silent film produced by Metro Pictures; lost film
1931	Their Mad Moment	Basquerie	Film produced by Fox Film Corporation
1931	Mi último amor	Basquerie	Film produced by Fox Film Corporation; Spanish language version of Their Mad Moment
1941	The Perfect Snob	Basquerie	Film produced by Fox Film Corporation; remake of Their Mad Moment

==== Broadway ====
Year	Title	Story based on
1929	Unknown	Basquerie
