= Death and state funeral of Ulysses S. Grant =

1885 funeral of the 18th U.S. president

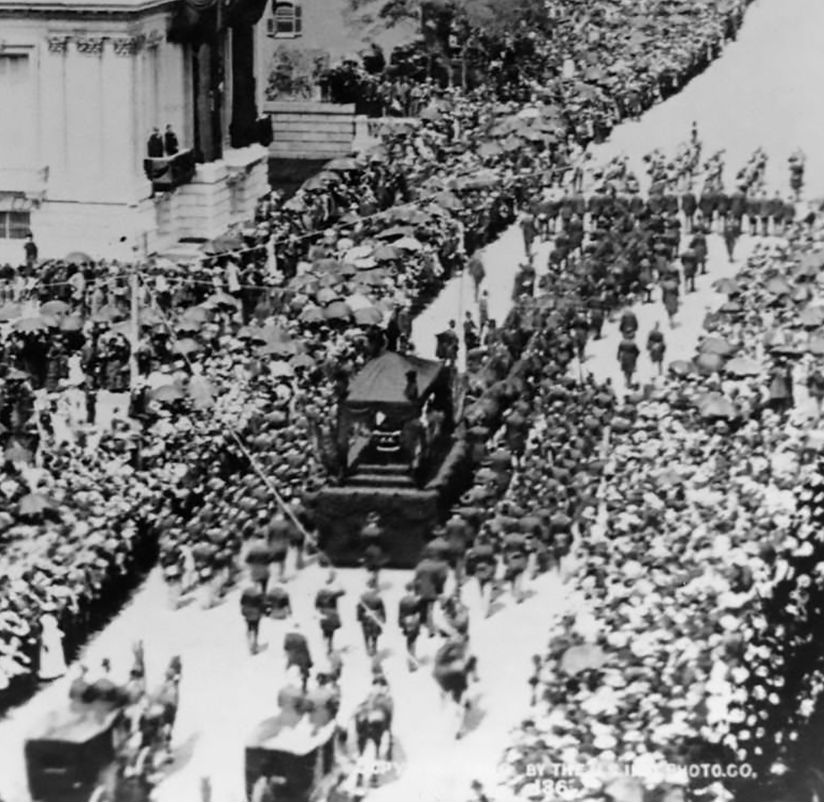
- Grant's funeral procession in New York City
- Date: August 8, 1885 (state funeral); August 8, 1885– September 8, 1885 (mourning period)
- Location: New York City
- Participants: Rutherford B. Hayes; Chester A. Arthur; Grover Cleveland; Thomas A. Hendricks; William Tecumseh Sherman; Philip Sheridan; Mark Twain; Members of the 49th Congress
- Burial: Grant's Tomb, New York City

Ulysses S. Grant, the 18th President of the United States and Commanding General of the Union Army during the American Civil War, died on July 23, 1885 at the age of 63. He had been sick with throat cancer and his illness had been extensively covered by the press. His funeral was held August 8, 1885, in New York, featuring a funeral procession of 60,000 men as well as a 30-day, nationwide period of mourning.

Grant's funeral procession surpassed any public demonstration in the United States up until that time, with an attendance of 1.5 million people, as well as additional ceremonies held in other major cities around the country. People who eulogized him likened him to George Washington and Abraham Lincoln, then the nation's two greatest heroes.

== Illness and death ==
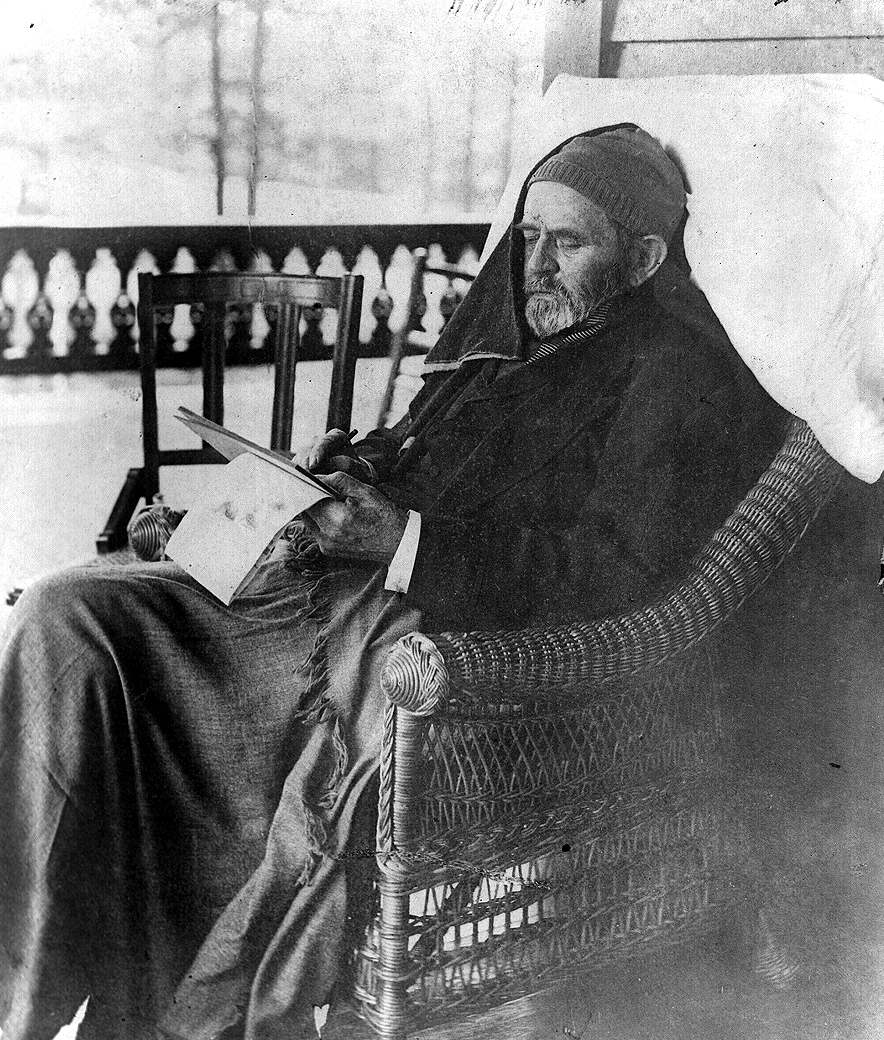
Grant at his home in Wilton, New York, less than a month before his death

Grant attended a service for Civil War veterans in Ocean Grove, New Jersey, on August 4, 1884, receiving a standing ovation from the ten thousand attendees; it would be his last public appearance. In the summer of 1884, Grant complained of a sore throat but put off seeing a doctor until late October, when he learned it was cancer, likely caused by his frequent cigar smoking. Grant chose not to reveal the seriousness of his condition to his wife, who soon found out from Grant's doctor.

In March 1885, The New York Times announced that Grant was dying of cancer, causing nationwide public concern. Knowing of Grant and Julia's financial difficulties, Congress restored him to the rank of General of the Army with full retirement pay—Grant's assumption of the presidency had required that he resign his commission and forfeit his (and his widow's) pension.

Grant, nearly penniless and worried about leaving his wife money to live on, spent his last months working intensely on his memoirs. Grant's friend Mark Twain, one of the few who understood Grant's precarious financial condition, offered him an unheard-of 70% royalty for the book. His former staff member Adam Badeau assisted with the research, while his son Frederick located documents and did much of the fact-checking. Because of the summer heat and humidity, his doctors recommended that he move upstate to a cottage at the top of Mount McGregor, offered by a family friend.

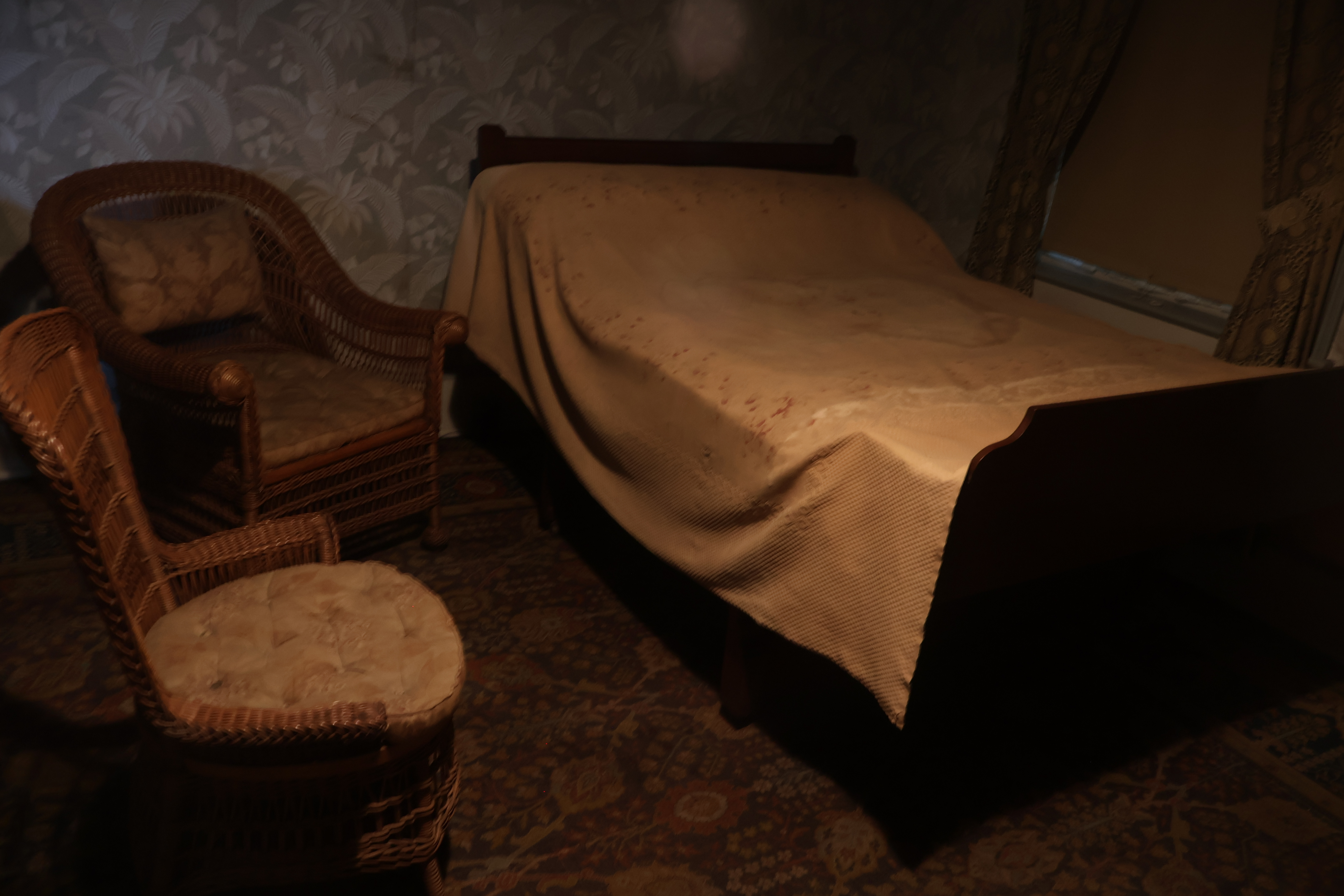
Grant's deathbed at Grant Cottage

On July 18, 1885, Grant finished his memoirs, Personal Memoirs of U. S. Grant, which proved to be a critical and commercial success and left his wife financially secure. He died in the Mount McGregor cottage on July 23, 1885.

== Funeral ==
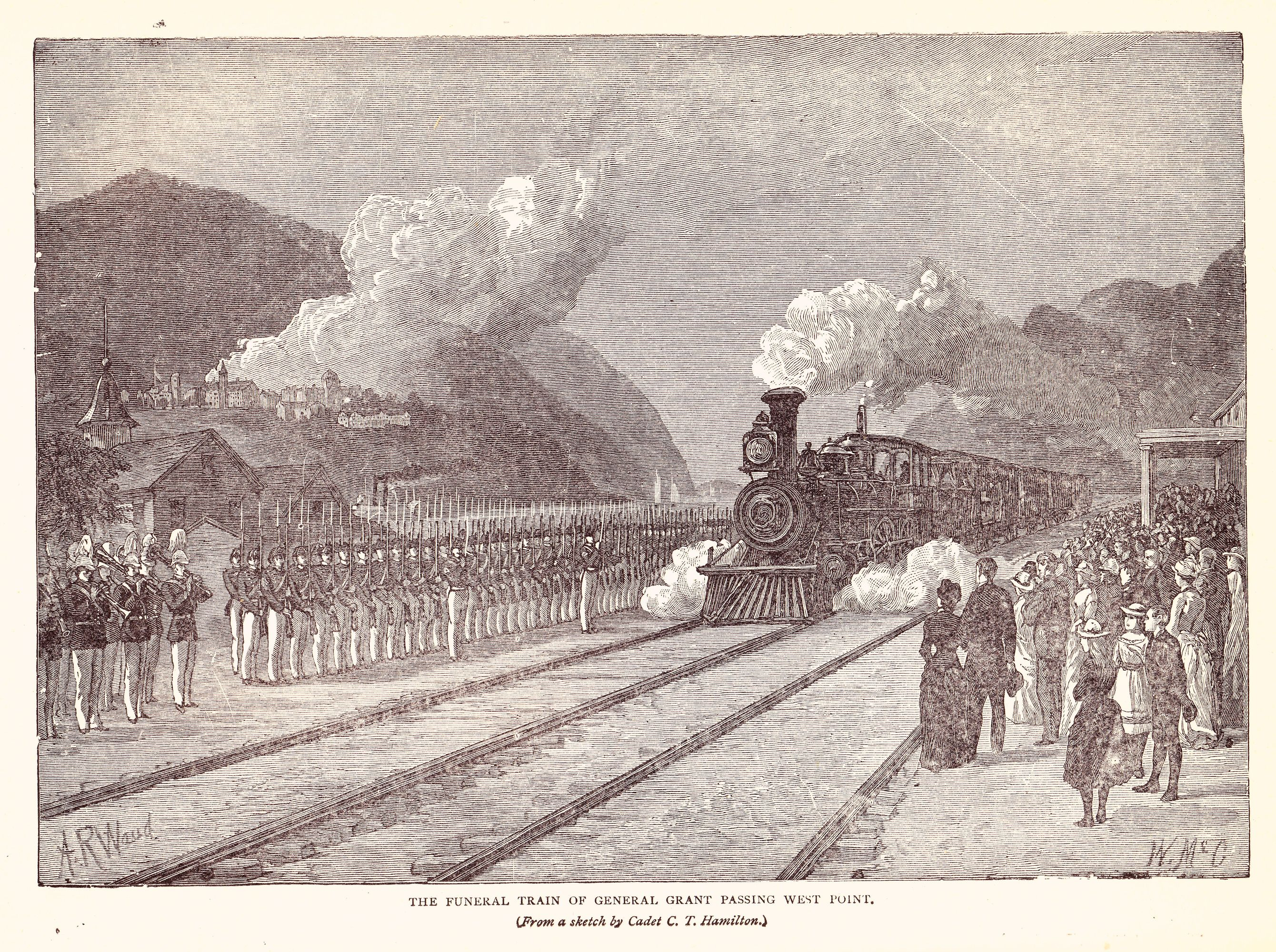
Grant's funeral train at West Point

Philip Sheridan, then Commanding General of the Army, ordered a day-long tribute to Grant on all military posts, and President Grover Cleveland ordered a thirty-day nationwide period of mourning. After private services, the honor guard placed Grant's body on a funeral train, which traveled to West Point and New York City. A quarter of a million people viewed it in the two days before the funeral.

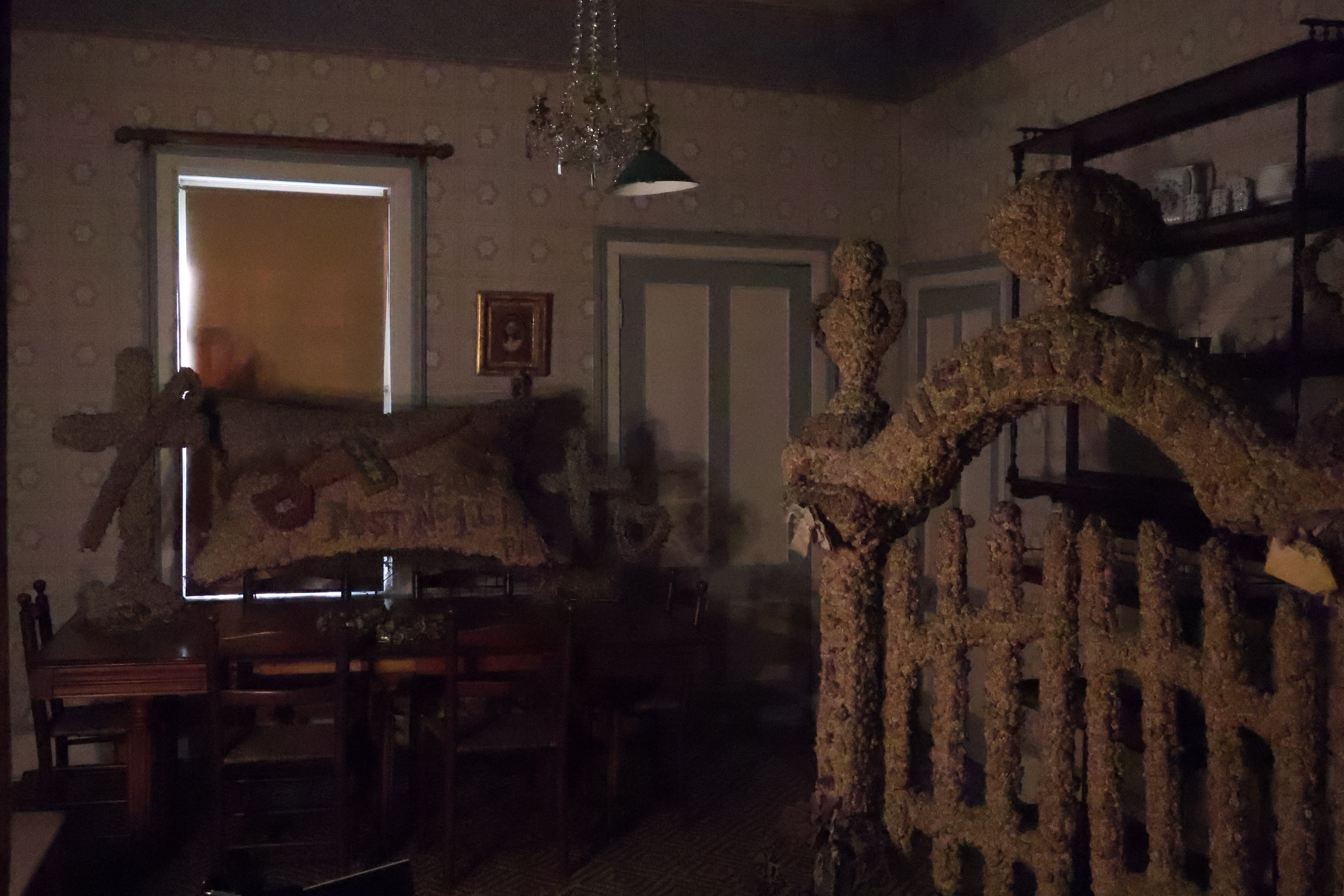
Preserved funerary flower arrangements at Grant Cottage

Tens of thousands of men, many of them veterans from the Grand Army of the Republic (GAR), marched with Grant's casket drawn by two dozen black stallions to Riverside Park in Morningside Heights, Manhattan. His pallbearers included Union generals William Tecumseh Sherman and Philip Sheridan, Confederate generals Simon Bolivar Buckner and Joseph E. Johnston, Admiral David Dixon Porter, and Senator John A. Logan, the head of the GAR. Following the casket in the seven-mile-long (11 km) procession were President Cleveland, two former living presidents Rutherford B. Hayes and Chester A. Arthur, all of the president's cabinet, and justices of the Supreme Court.

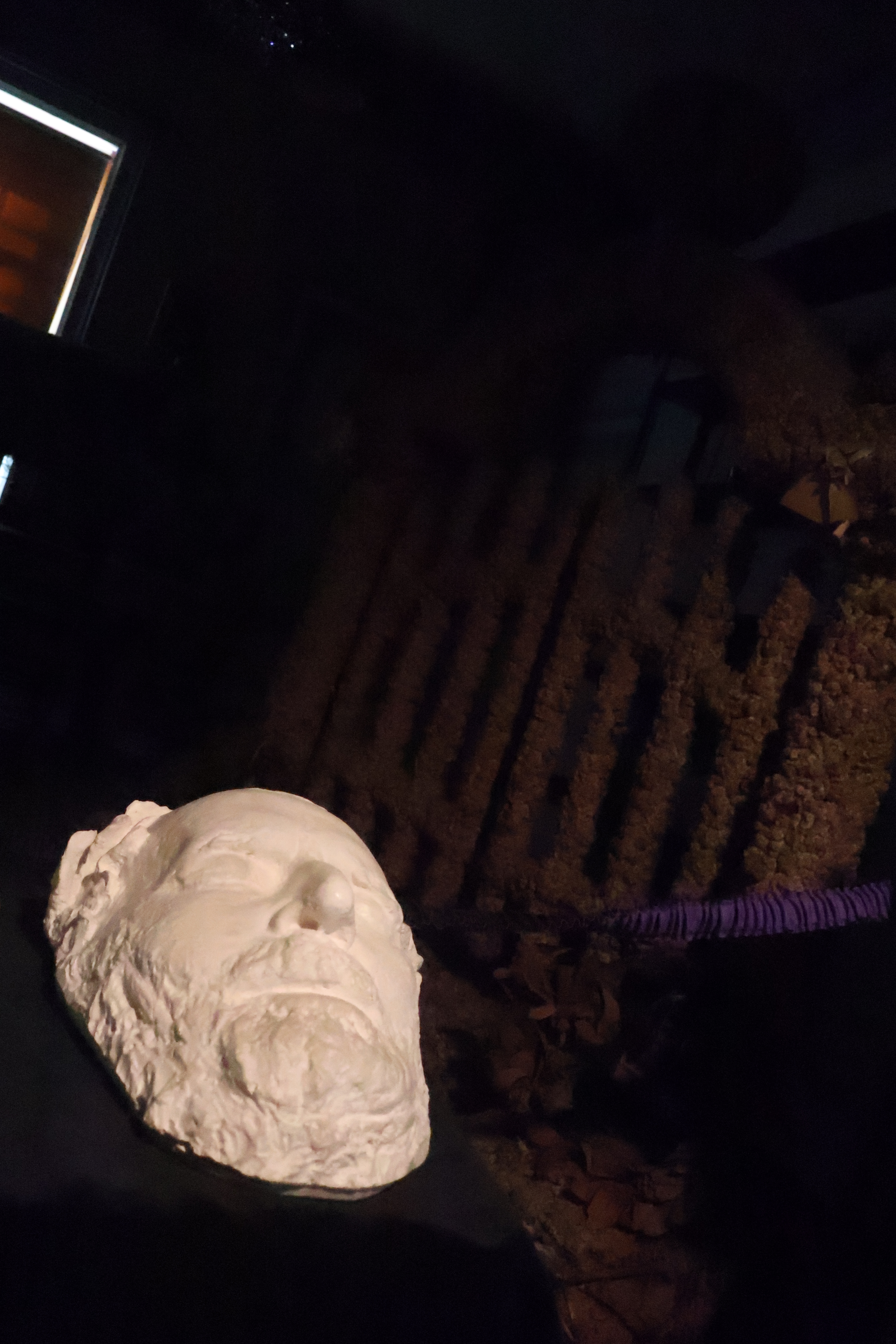
Copy of death mask and preserved funeral flowers at Grant Cottage

Attendance at the New York funeral topped 1.5 million. Ceremonies were held in other major cities around the country, while Grant was eulogized in the press.

== Burial ==
Grant was buried in Riverside Park, first in a temporary tomb, and then on April 17, 1897, in the General Grant National Memorial. Known as "Grant's Tomb", it is the largest mausoleum in North America.
