= Mount McGregor Correctional Facility =

Former New York State prison

Coordinates: 43°12′06″N 73°44′54″W

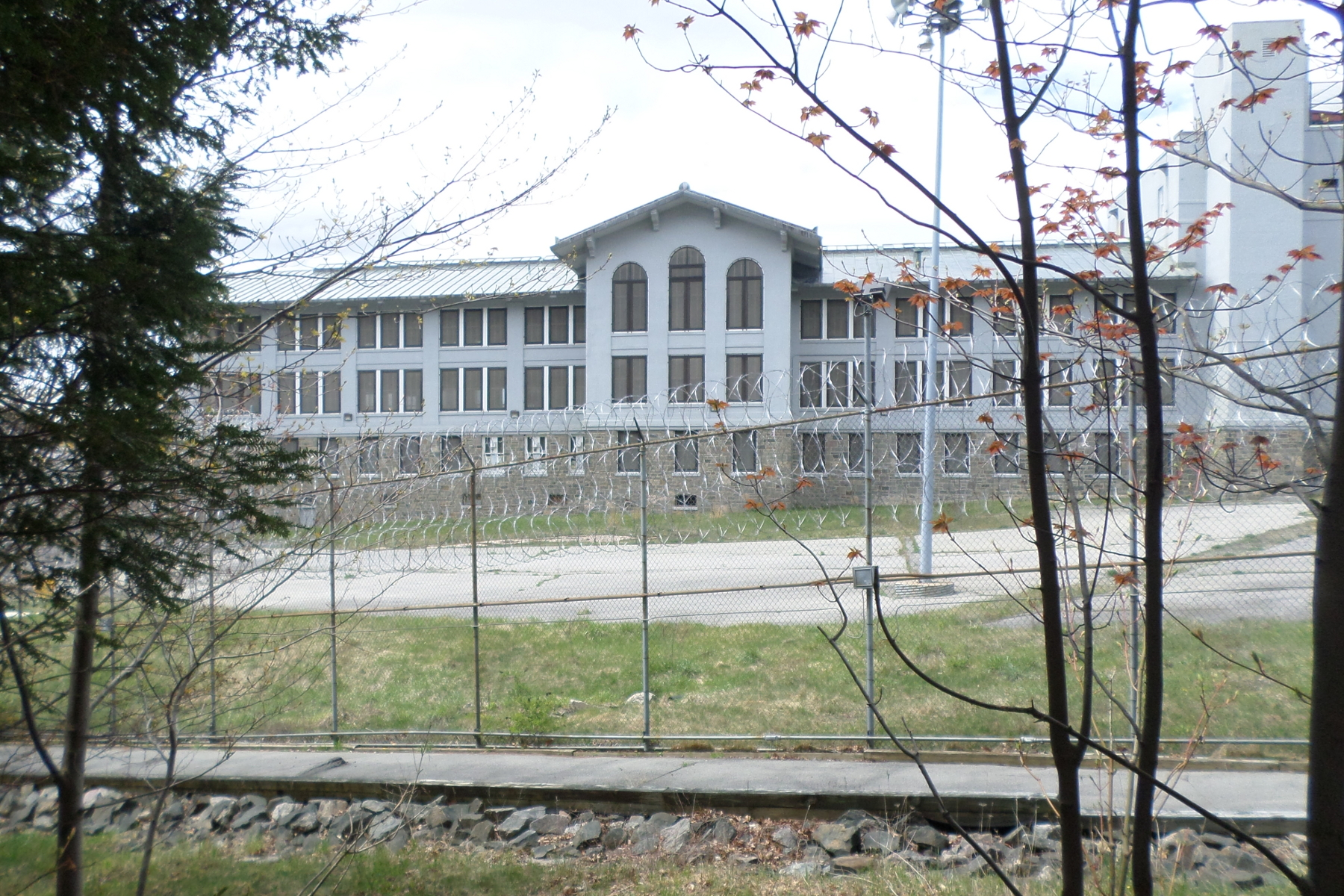
One of the closed buildings at Mount McGregor in 2016

Mount McGregor Correctional Facility was a medium security prison for male inmates in the Town of Moreau, Saratoga County, New York, United States. It was served by the Wilton, New York, post office and included 100 structures on over 1,000 acres. Before updating security, it was called "Camp Walkaway" due to the number of breakouts. It became a prison in 1976, housing a maximum of 540 inmates, and eventually closed 38 years later, on July 26, 2014.

== History ==
The peak, Mount McGregor, was originally called "Palmertown Mountain", named after a local native tribe. It was renamed after Duncan McGregor, who purchased the land in a tax sale and constructed a small resort along with a restaurant for summer visitors. The Saratoga, Mount McGregor and Lake George Railroad later bought the property and opened a more sumptuous resort at the end of a rail line. When the Hotel Balmoral burned in 1897, the resort faded in popularity.

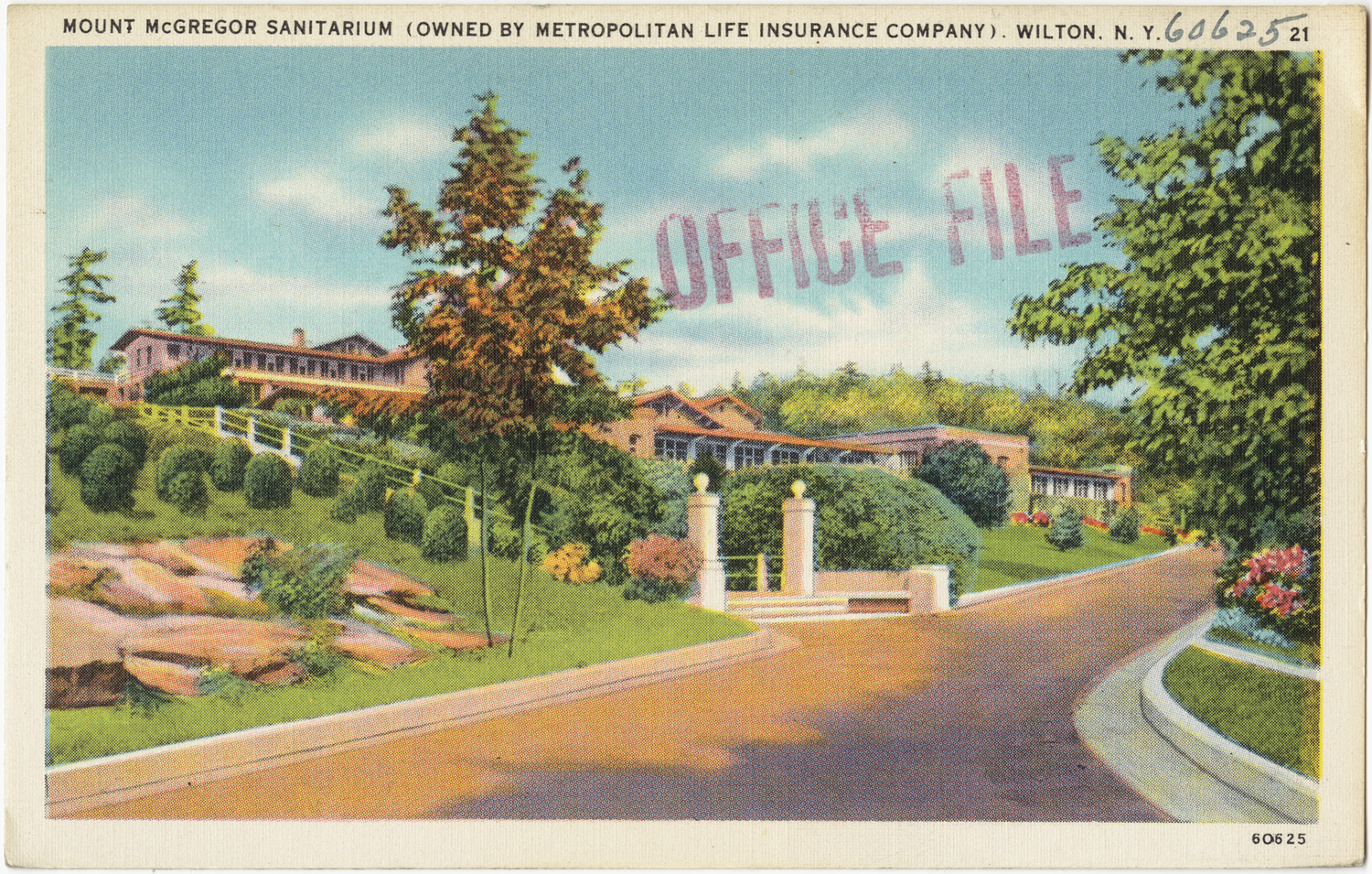
Metropolitan Life Insurance Co. Sanatorium Infirmary at Mount McGregor

The "Sanatorium on the Mountain" at Mount McGregor was opened in 1913 by the Metropolitan Life Insurance Company for the benefit of its employees suffering from tuberculosis. This sanatorium, fully staffed by doctors and a nursing staff, had a goal of restoring the health of all the company's employees. A labyrinth of underground passages still exist that were used to transport corpses of patients to the church and crematorium. The sanitorium closed in 1945.

After World War II, the sanatorium served as a facility for military veterans returning to civilian life. Local stories suggest Playboy magazine founder Hugh Hefner looked into purchasing the property in the 1960s or early 1970s.

In 1960 the facility was taken over by the State of New York as a school for the developmentally disabled. At first the school was the Mount McGregor division of Rome State School and then became Wilton State School.

The New York State Department of Corrections assumed control in 1976. At first the complex was a minimum-security prison, later adding medium-security facilities. It consisted of 100 structures on over 1,000 acres, including dormitories, a 1915 Mission-style chapel with a pipe organ, a dining hall with large windows and panoramic views, newly-built gymnasium and medical building, and a lake. Administrative services, such as Reception or Commissary, were located on the lower level, in the tunnels connecting the buildings. The buildings covered 550,000 square feet and ranged in age from 1913 to 2007. The prison, which used only the central cluster of buildings, closed in 2014.

== Future use ==
Neighboring Moreau Lake State Park will incorporate 750 undeveloped acres of the former facility. In 2015, the state began considering proposals for the sale of an additional 325 acres, including all the buildings, for redevelopment.

As of 2017, the prison has not been sold and the site is still closed to the public.

In 2022, Steve Brodt, founder of Haunted Nights, filed a proposal with the state's economic development arm to reimagine Mount McGregor. He and his business partner, Mark Erskine, a real estate investor who lives outside Chicago, were reported to be preparing to submit a purchase offer to the state.

Brodt, of Glens Falls, wants to use the prison to host events similar to the tours that Haunted Nights conducts across the country: in a former county jail in Salem, an old asylum near Pittsburgh and a former mineral springs hotel on the Mississippi River.

== Grant Cottage ==
Grant Cottage State Historic Site, where former U.S. president and army general Ulysses S. Grant spent the last six weeks of his life, was within the grounds of the correctional facility and visitors had to pass a checkpoint. Grant spent the last weeks of his life there, finishing his memoirs, the Personal Memoirs of Ulysses S. Grant, just a few days before he died. The historic site is not part of the area to be sold. A fence prevented inmates from entering the grounds of the cottage.

== See also ==
- List of New York state prisons
