= Saratoga, Mount McGregor and Lake George Railroad =

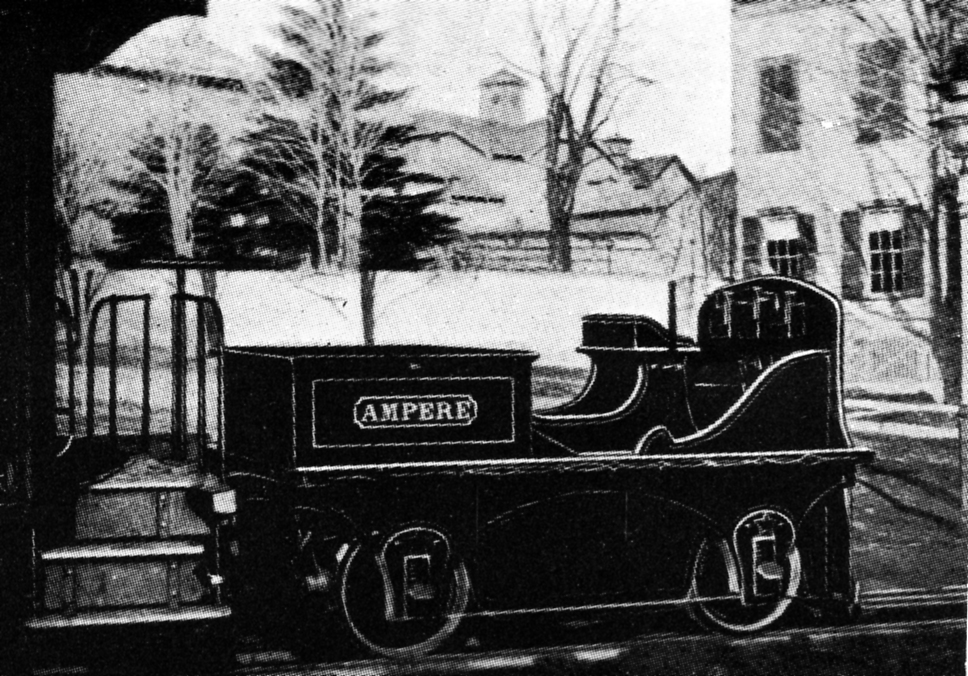
- Electric locomotive Ampère, built by Leo Daft and tested on the Saratoga, Mount McGregor and Lake George Railroad in 1883

Overview
- Dates of operation: 1882–1889
- Successor: Mount McGregor Railroad

Technical
- Track gauge: 3 ft (914 mm)
- Length: 10.5 miles (16.9 km)

The Saratoga, Mount McGregor and Lake George Railroad was a railroad leading from North Broadway in Saratoga Springs, New York, USA, controlled by the financier Joseph William Drexel. The railroad ran for approximately 12 miles (19 km) through the towns of Saratoga Springs, Wilton, Moreau and Corinth to the top of Mount McGregor.

== History ==
Construction was begun on March 17, 1882, and was completed on July 17 the same year, for the purpose of conveying building materials and later passengers to the Hotel Balmoral on the top of Mt. McGregor. The railroad was built to a 3 ft (914 mm) narrow gauge.

In November 1883, Leo Daft tested the electric locomotive Ampere generating 12 horsepower (25 according to some sources) along the line. The locomotive pulled a 10-ton load up a 1.5 percent grade in 11 minutes. (Note: Although Bianculli describes the Ampere as "the first standard gauge electric locomotive to be built in the country," the Saratoga, Mount McGregor and Lake George Railroad was and remained a narrow gauge road.)

== Subsequent ownership ==
The company entered receivership in 1888 and was sold on October 13, 1888. The company was reorganized as the Mount McGregor Railroad on April 18, 1889. This new company lasted two years before again entering receivership. The company was sold to new ownership in 1893, and then acquired by the Saratoga and Mount McGregor Railway on April 23, 1897. The road remained financially troubled, and another new company, the Saratoga Northern Railway, took ownership in June 1898.

In December 1897, the hotel at the top of the mountain burned. After foreclosure proceedings, the hotel and railroad property were sold in auction on March 6, 1893. In 1913, a sanitorium was constructed. It went through different purposes until it became Mount McGregor Correctional Facility.
