= Moreau Lake (New York) =

Lake in Saratoga County, New York, US

- Location within New York Location within the United States
- Location: Saratoga County, New York, United States
- Coordinates: 43°13′53″N 073°42′42″W
- Type: Lake
- Basin countries: United States
- Surface area: 128 acres (0.52 km^{2})
- Average depth: 32 feet (9.8 m)
- Max. depth: 50 feet (15 m)
- Shore length^{1}: 3.6 miles (5.8 km)
- Surface elevation: 338 feet (103 m)
- Settlements: Fortsville, New York
- ^{1} Shore length is not a well-defined measure.

Moreau Lake is located west of Fortsville, New York. Fish species present in the lake are rainbow trout, pickerel, smallmouth bass, largemouth bass, yellow perch, pumpkinseed sunfish, and brown bullhead. There is a boat rental place on the lake. There is a state owned boat launch and carry down in Moreau Lake State Park. No motors are allowed on this lake.
