= Personal Memoirs of U. S. Grant =

Autobiography of Ulysses S. Grant

The Personal Memoirs of U. S. Grant
- First edition
- Author: Ulysses S. Grant
- Language: English
- Genre: Memoir
- Publisher: Charles L. Webster & Company
- Publication date: 1885 and 1886
- Publication place: United States
- Pages: 584 (Vol. I) 648 (Vol. II)
- Dewey Decimal: 973.8
- LC Class: 10032706
- Text: The Personal Memoirs of U. S. Grant at Wikisource

The Personal Memoirs of U. S. Grant are an autobiography, in two volumes, of Ulysses S. Grant, the 18th President of the United States. The work focuses on his military career during the Mexican–American War and the American Civil War. The volumes were written in the last year of Grant's life, amid increasing pain from terminal throat cancer and in an effort to restore the Grant family's finances and provide for his widow after his bankruptcy at the hands of an early Ponzi scheme. The set was published by Mark Twain shortly after Grant's death in July 1885.

Twain, a literary superstar and personal friend of Grant, created a marketing system to reach millions of veterans with a patriotic appeal just as the general's death was being mourned. Ten thousand agents canvassed the North for orders, following a script that Twain had devised. Many were Union veterans dressed in their old uniforms, who went door-to-door offering the two-volume set at prices ranging from $3.50 to $12, depending on the binding ($130 to $430 in 2025).

These efforts sold 350,000 two-volume sets in advance of the book's actual printing. This made the Memoirs one of the bestselling books of the 19th century. In its first year, it outsold even the publishing behemoth Uncle Tom's Cabin. For comparison, the 1876 publication of memoirs of Grant's colleague William Tecumseh Sherman was deemed a great success for selling 25,000 copies in its first decade. Grant's widow, Julia, received about $450,000 ($16,100,000 in 2025) from Twain during the first three years of publication.

Despite being explicitly written for money, and with a focus on those aspects of Grant's life most likely to induce sales, the combination of an honest man exploited in a financial scheme and then marked for death by cancer lent the Memoirs immense contemporary interest. The Personal Memoirs of U. S. Grant received universal acclaim on its publication and has remained highly regarded by the general public, military historians, and literary critics. Grant's prose has been praised as lean, intelligent and effective. He candidly depicts his battles against both the Confederates and his internal Army foes.

== Background ==
=== World tour and money troubles ===
Grant and his wife Julia took a trip around the world in 1877 after his second term in office. Personally financed, this tour left him short on liquid assets on his return. He was nearly 60 and he looked for something to engage his time and replenish his finances. In 1878, he moved to New York City and entered into business with his son Buck (Ulysses S. Grant, Jr.) and Ferdinand Ward. Ward was a young investor and personal friend of the junior Grant. Ward was described by his great-grandson Geoffrey Ward as "a very plausible, charming, unobtrusive, slender person with a genius for finding older people and pleasing them, which he learned early on."

=== Ponzi scheme, personal bankruptcy and cancer diagnosis ===
The firm of Grant & Ward did well at first, bolstered by Ward's skills and Grant's name. The former president bragged to friends that he was worth two and a half million dollars, and family members and friends poured money into the firm. But Grant was largely disengaged from the company's business, often signing papers without reading them. This proved disastrous, as Ward had used the firm as a Ponzi scheme, taking investors' money and spending it on personal items, including a mansion in Connecticut and a brownstone in New York City. Grant & Ward failed in May 1884, leaving Grant penniless. That fall, the elder Grant was diagnosed with terminal throat cancer.

=== Century Company publishing deal ===
Long before his diagnosis Grant wrote a series of articles analyzing many of the battles he had overseen. The Century Company published these articles in their flagship periodical, Century Magazine. Century paid Grant a flat author's fee of $500 (nearly $17,000 in 2024) per article. The essays were well received by critics and in 1876 the editor of Century Magazine, Robert Underwood Johnson, suggested Grant expand them into a memoir, as William Tecumseh Sherman had recently done to great acclaim. Facing his own mortality and the prospect of his family's destitution after his death, Grant approached Century with a proposal to publish his personal memoirs, serially and then in bound volumes. Century agreed to publish the work and drew up a contract in which the dying man would receive 10% of every sale of the book.

=== Mark Twain intervenes ===
Grant's personal friend Samuel Clemens (better known by his pen name, Mark Twain) soon heard news of this publishing deal. He was unable to conceal his disapproval at how little money he thought Grant stood to earn if the dying man agreed to Century's terms. Twain dropped everything and rushed to New York City from his home in Hartford, Connecticut. When Twain entered the Grant home on 66th St. he noticed Grant's eldest son, Frederick reviewing the Century contract one final time before his father signed it. Twain recalled that Grant was on the point of picking up his pen as the novelist arrived.

Twain intervened in the signing and asked to know the terms of the contract. In his autobiography, Twain stated, "He [Grant] read the rough draft aloud and I didn't know whether to cry or laugh." After hearing the terms, Twain declared the terms of the contract giving Grant 10% of all sales was insultingly low and amounted to exploitation of the former president's dire situation. Twain insisted that he could secure a far more favorable publishing contract for Grant and pressed him for his proxy in new negotiations. Grant felt a personal loyalty to the executives of Century, and considered it dishonorable to back out of his contract after all details had been agreed upon and papers drawn up. Twain grew exasperated and confessed that he himself had far better terms from his own publisher, the American Publishing Company.

==== Twain's proposal ====
The key element in Mark Twain's proposal to Grant was publication through a subscription scheme. Twain himself was preparing to publish his own Adventures of Huckleberry Finn through a subscription plan. This involved door-to-door salesmen (often Civil War veterans) who collected upfront fees by which the eventual publication would be financed. Without a publisher's capital in play to cover printing and distribution, subscription gave the author far more power in determining their eventual share of sales. Further, under a subscription scheme, tens of thousands of dollars would be generated before the finished book was even bound. Twain was famously persuasive and this upfront cash was a powerful inducement to a man in Grant's situation, however it was only after Frederick suggested the present contract be set aside for 24 hours, until the facts of Twain's claims could be investigated, that his father agreed put off signing the Century contract.

Knowing the former general's reputation for stubbornness, Twain privately fretted that 24 hours would not be enough time to convince Grant to change his mind. In the end it was Grant's sense of honor, coupled with his fear the memoirs would prove a flop, that persuaded him to accept Twain's plan: Twain had recommended Charles Webster Publishing, a new house run by his wife's nephew and largely capitalized by Twain himself. A subscription would not require Grant to put the money Twain had invested in Charles Webster at risk to publish his memoirs, as the capital necessary for publication and distribution would have been generated by subscription before printing. Such was Twain's faith in Grant's prose and the national interest in his thoughts that he gave Grant a sizeable advance anyway.

It is not known how large a role Twain's own financial difficulties played in his decision to intervene in the publication of Grant's memoirs or in his suggestion that the former president use a publisher in which Twain was a significant investor. Notwithstanding the money Twain stood to make from the successful publication of Grant's memoirs, the final terms agreed upon were immensely favorable to the dying man: he or his heirs would receive 70% of all profits generated by subscriptions and sales of the memoir, plus a $25,000 advance (equivalent to $850,000 in 2023) paid from Twain's own pocket. Over the two years following publication this percentage would generate more than $450,000 (equivalent to $15,300,000 today) in royalties for Julia Grant.

=== Composition ===
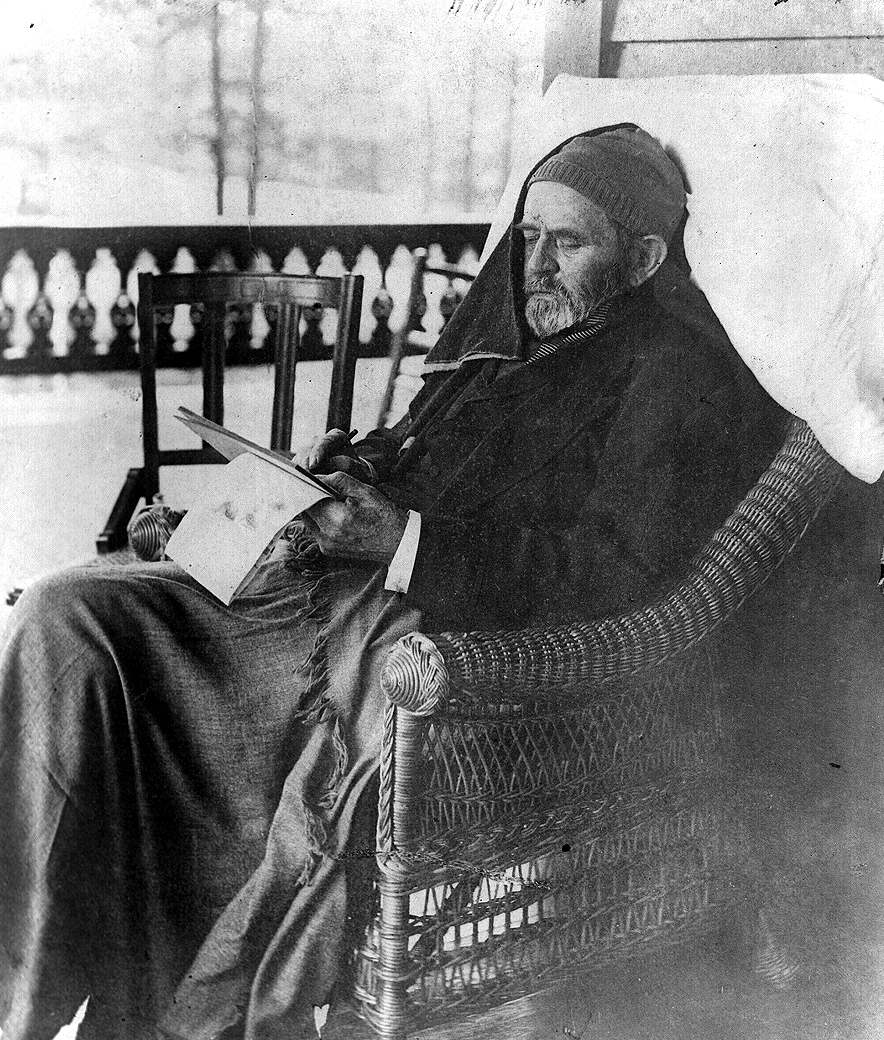
Ulysses S. Grant, at a cottage in Mt. McGregor, New York, 1885, working on his memoirs

Twain moved into Grant's New York City townhouse and remained literally at Grant's side while the dying man wrote up his life. Twain provided literary and copy editing at all stages of the book's composition, often offering advice on a page-by-page basis as he sat next to his furiously scribbling friend. Despite his worsening condition and the constant pain it produced, Twain said that Grant wrote as a man possessed. During the evenings Twain would read all pages produced during that day and make suggestions to enhance consistency and tone. These evening readings often amounted to an astonishing fifty pages of draft, a pace that Grant maintained for more than four months.

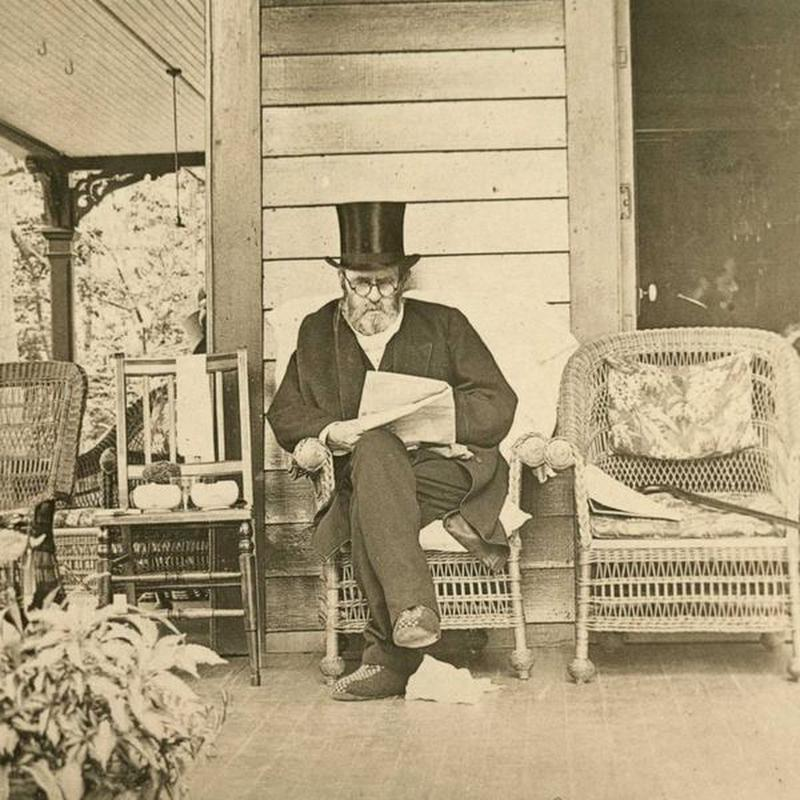
Grant one day after completing his Memoirs, seen on the porch of the McGregor cabin, in his last known photograph.

Throughout his career Grant had repeatedly told highly detailed stories of his military experiences, sometimes making slight mistakes in terms of dates and locations. As a hardscrabble farmer in St. Louis just before the war he had kept his neighbors spellbound until midnight while they "listen[ed] intently to his vivid narrations of Army experiences." In calm moments during the Civil War he often spoke of his recent experiences, typically "in terse and often eloquent language." Grant had told and retold his war stories so many times that writing his Memoirs was often simply a matter of repetition and polish instead of a more typical summarization of his recollections. This fact, as much as any reticence to discuss his childhood or presidency, may account for the Memoirs' overwhelming focus on the Mexican-American and Civil Wars.

Grant suffered greatly in his final year. He was in constant pain from his illness and was sometimes beset by choking episodes that only abated after Grant had vomited a large quantity of blood. Despite his condition, he wrote at a furious pace, sometimes finishing 25 to 50 pages a day. The cancer spread throughout his body and at his doctor's urging in June 1885, to make his last weeks more comfortable, the family moved to a cottage in Mount MacGregor, New York. He raced to finish the book, propped up in chairs and too weak to walk. Friends, admirers, and even a few former Confederate opponents made their way to Mount MacGregor to pay their respects. Grant completed the manuscript on July 18; he died five days later.

=== Royalties ===
Grant's widow, Julia, received about $450,000 ($16,100,000 in 2025) from Twain during the first three years of publication, suggesting that Grant received around 30% of each sale (i.e., a 30% royalty rate).

== Adam Badeau ==
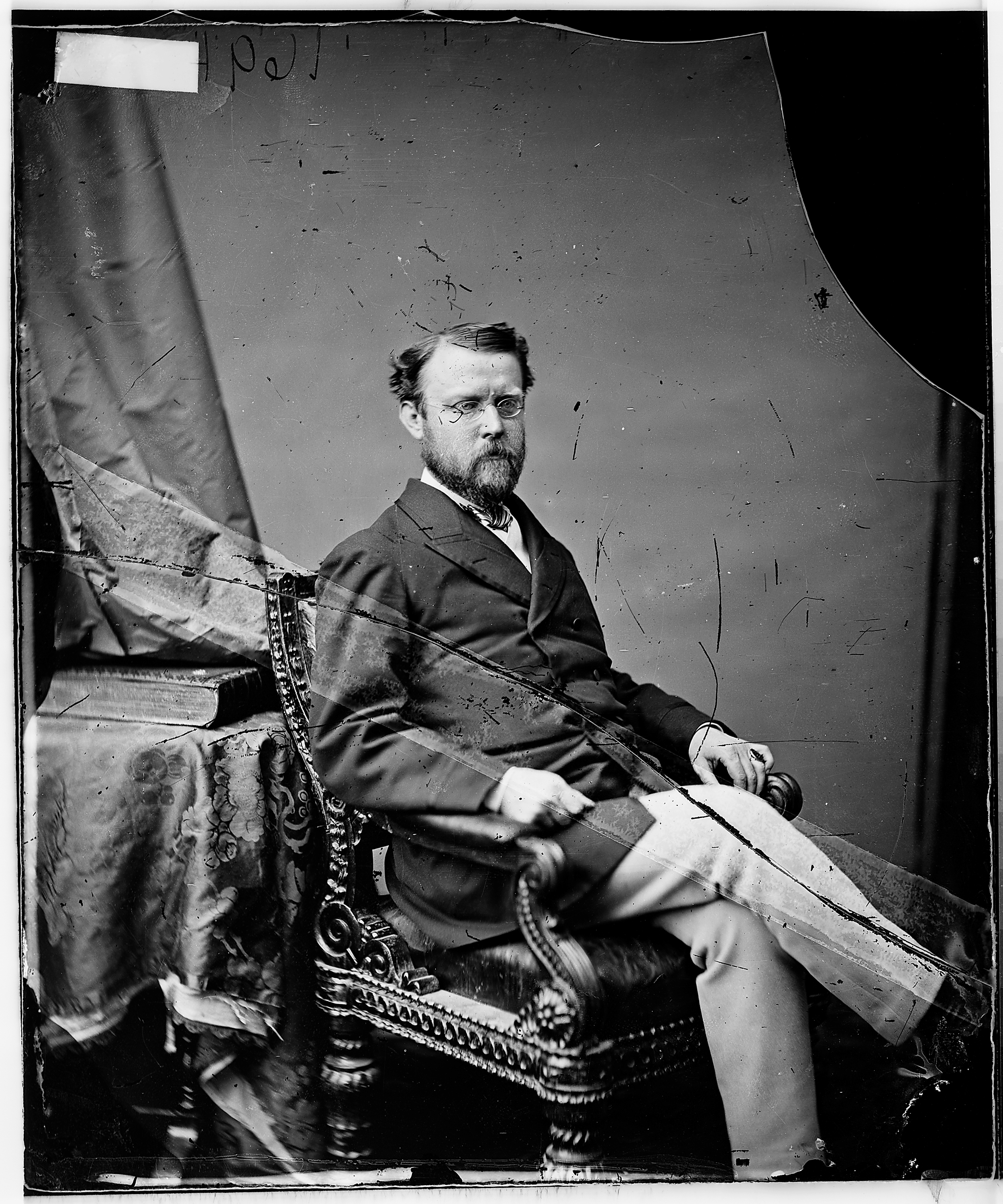
Adam Badeau, who assisted Grant during the first month of writing his Memoirs.

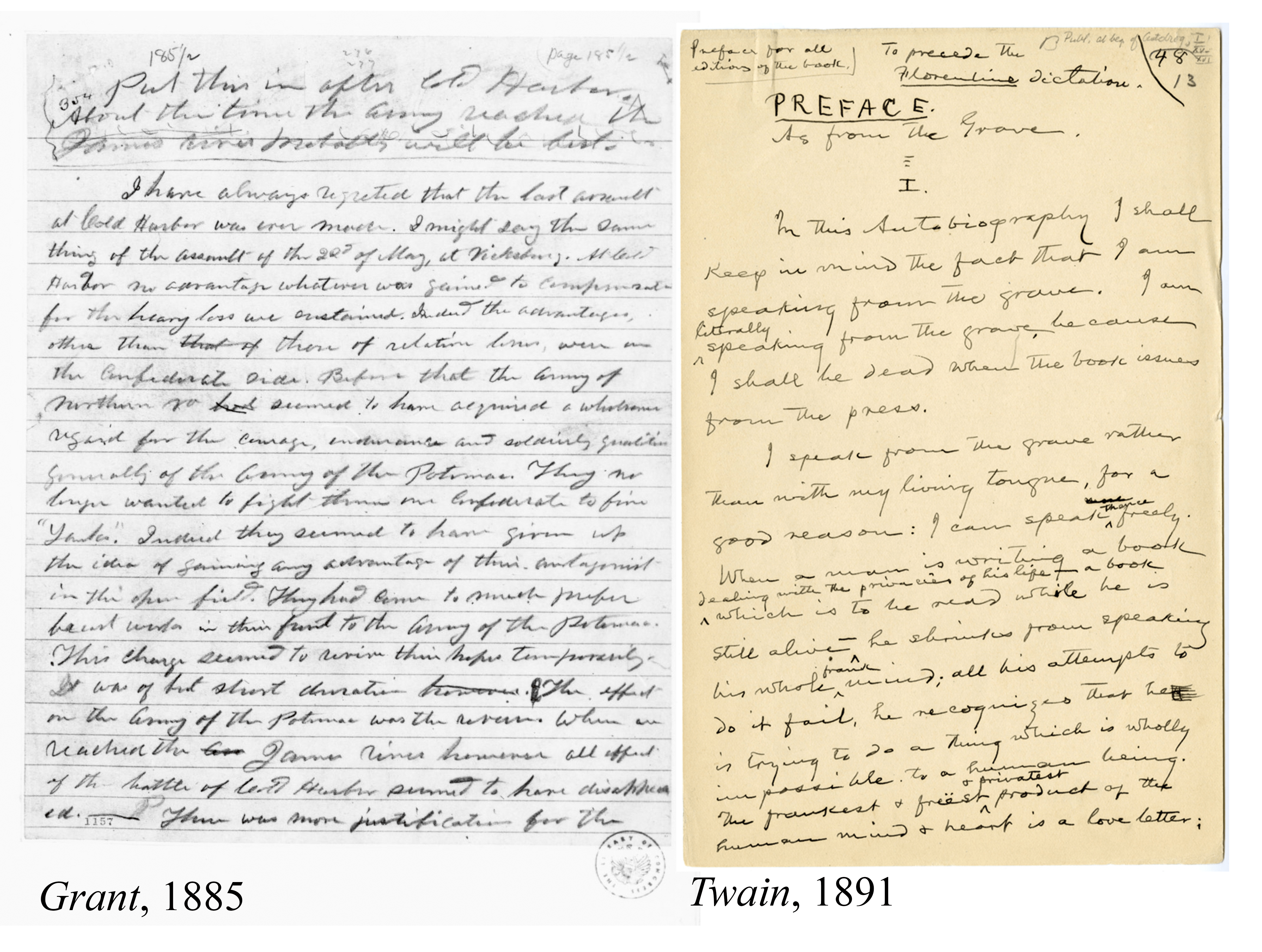
The handwriting in the manuscript of Grant's Memoirs and that of his friend Mark Twain, showing that Twain was neither the author nor took dictation of Grant's Memoirs.

In the early stages of writing his Memoirs, Grant had the assistance of Adam Badeau, an author and former army officer, who had served on Grant's staff during the war. Badeau left before the project was complete, having disputed with Grant and his family concerning how much he would be paid and how he would be credited for his research, editing, and fact-checking. This led Badeau to spread the rumor that Twain ghostwrote Grant's memoirs. In fact, the original manuscript is written only in Grant's handwriting. Grant's son Frederick took over many of Badeau's fact-checking and research responsibilities after the author's departure in May 1885. Badeau eventually settled with Grant's heirs for $10,000 (equivalent to $358,000 in 2025) in the fall of 1888.

== Structure ==
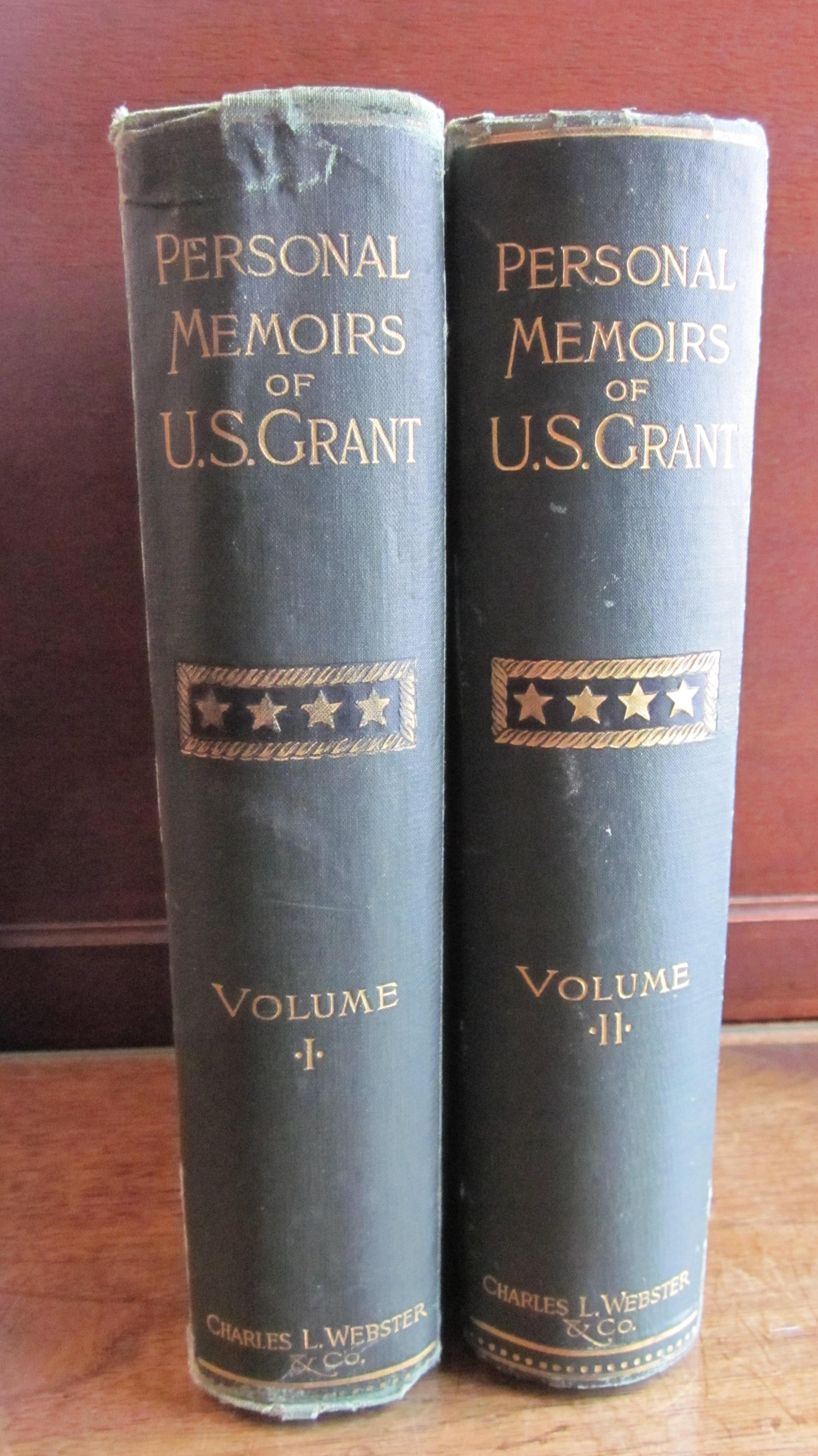
Original editions of Grant's memoirs.

The Memoirs are divided into two volumes. The autobiography is unusual, but not unique, in that large sections of Grant's life such as his childhood and the presidency are given either brief mention or not discussed at all. The focus of the book is Grant's military career during the Mexican–American and Civil Wars.

Grant's writing has been praised for its conciseness and clarity—a sharp contrast from contemporary Civil War memoirs, which tended to reflect the Victorian fondness for elaborate language.

With regard to the Mexican–American War, Grant recorded his belief that it had been waged unjustly:

Generally, the officers of the army were indifferent whether the annexation was consummated or not; but not so all of them. For myself, I was bitterly opposed to the measure, and to this day regard the war, which resulted, as one of the most unjust ever waged by a stronger against a weaker nation. It was an instance of a republic following the bad example of European monarchies, in not considering justice in their desire to acquire additional territory.

His account of Lee's surrender at Appomattox Court House is particularly notable:

When I had left camp that morning I had not expected so soon the result that was then taking place, and consequently was in rough garb. I was without a sword, as I usually was when on horseback on the field, and wore a soldier's blouse for a coat, with the shoulder straps of my rank to indicate to the army who I was. When I went into the house I found General Lee. We greeted each other, and after shaking hands took our seats. I had my staff with me, a good portion of whom were in the room during the whole of the interview.

What General Lee's feelings were I do not know. As he was a man of much dignity, with an impassible face, it was impossible to say whether he felt inwardly glad that the end had finally come, or felt sad over the result, and was too manly to show it. Whatever his feelings, they were entirely concealed from my observation; but my own feelings, which had been quite jubilant on the receipt of his letter, were sad and depressed. I felt like anything rather than rejoicing at the downfall of a foe who had fought so long and valiantly, and had suffered so much for a cause, though that cause was, I believe, one of the worst for which a people ever fought, and one for which there was the least excuse. I do not question, however, the sincerity of the great mass of those who were opposed to us ...

We soon fell into a conversation about old army times. He remarked that he remembered me very well in the old army; and I told him that as a matter of course I remembered him perfectly, but from the difference in our rank and years (there being about sixteen years' difference in our ages), I had thought it very likely that I had not attracted his attention sufficiently to be remembered by him after such a long interval. Our conversation grew so pleasant that I almost forgot the object of our meeting. After the conversation had run on in this style for some time, General Lee called my attention to the object of our meeting, and said that he had asked for this interview for the purpose of getting from me the terms I proposed to give his army.

Grant also makes asides to clear up legends that had grown up around his leadership. After dismissing one tale, Grant wrote "Like many other stories, it would be very good if it were only true."

The narrative ends shortly after the Army of the Potomac's final review in Washington in May 1865. Grant deliberately avoids comment on Reconstruction, apart from saying that he favored black suffrage. The final chapter, "Conclusion," is a reflection on the war and its effects, the actions of foreign countries during it, and the reconciliation of North and South. In the final paragraphs, Grant makes note of his own condition and expresses optimism that "Federal and Confederate" can live together.

I cannot stay to be a living witness to the correctness of this prophecy; but I feel it within me that it is to be so. The universally kind feeling expressed for me at a time when it was supposed that each day would prove my last, seemed to me the beginning of the answer to "Let us have peace."

The expression of these kindly feelings were not restricted to a section of the country, nor to a division of the people. They came from individual citizens of all nationalities; from all denominations—the Protestant, the Catholic, and the Jew; and from the various societies of the land—scientific, educational, religious or otherwise. Politics did not enter into the matter at all.

I am not egotist enough to suppose all this significance should be given because I was the object of it. But the war between the States was a very bloody and a very costly war. One side or the other had to yield principles they deemed dearer than life before it could be brought to an end. I commanded the whole of the mighty host engaged on the victorious side. I was, no matter whether deservedly so or not, a representative of that side of the controversy. It is a significant and gratifying fact that Confederates should have joined heartily in this spontaneous move. I hope the good feeling inaugurated may continue to the end.

The work was published in a two-volume set after his death. Grant's printed signature followed the dedication: "These volumes are dedicated to the American Soldier and Sailor. / U. S. Grant / New York City / May 23rd, 1885." There are also numerous facsimile letters and correspondence bound into Volume II.

== Legacy ==
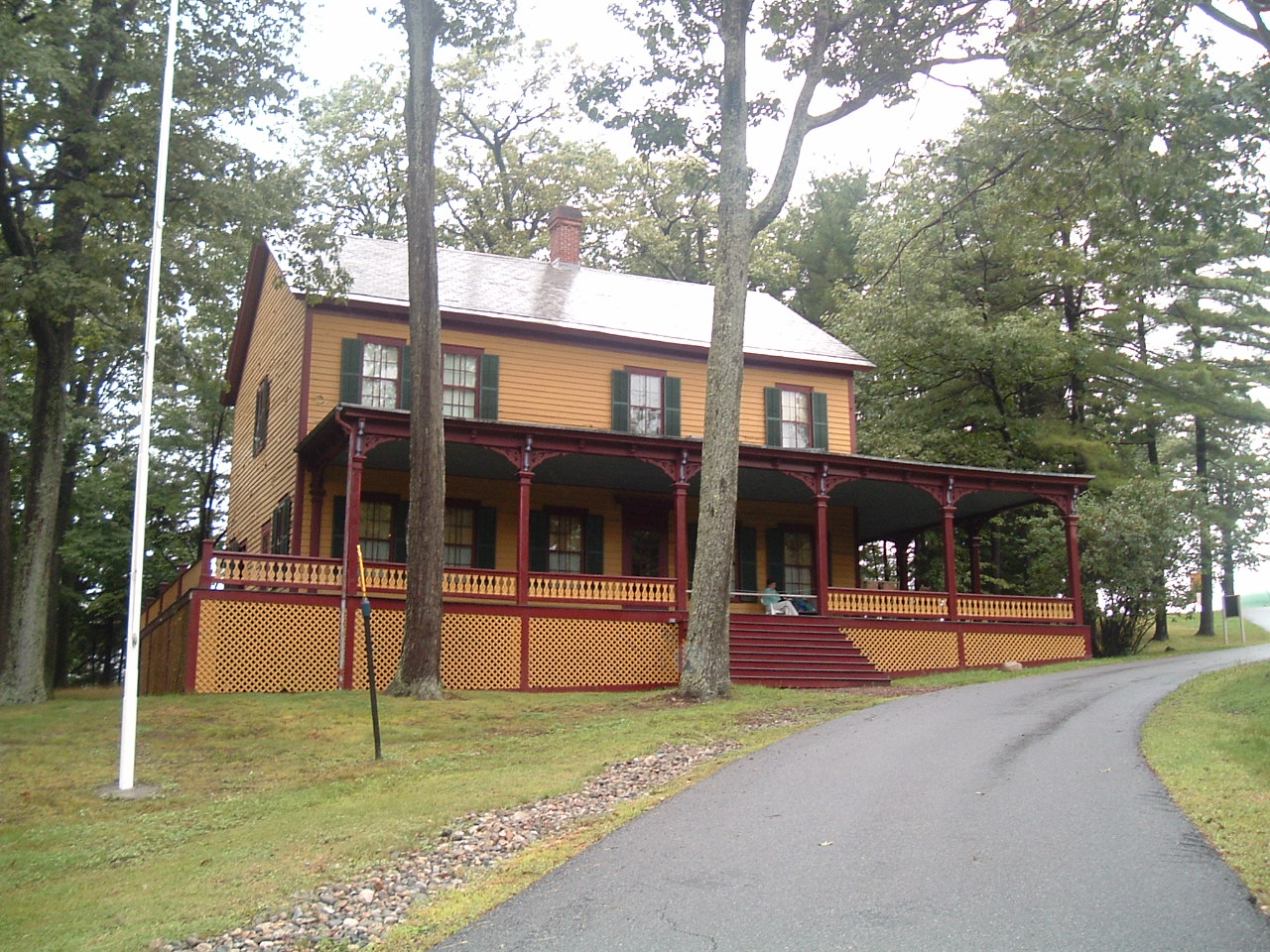
The Mount McGregor retreat now Grant Cottage State Historic Site in Wilton, New York, where Grant completed his memoirs, just before his death. The famous photo of a swaddled Grant writing in the summer of 1885 was taken on the left side of the front porch.

The press and public followed Grant's symptoms throughout his final year, and his work on the book was well known. While interest in his memoirs would have been high had Grant not been ill, his struggle to finish it before his death gave it even more attention.

On release, the book received universal critical praise. Twain compared the Memoirs to Julius Caesar's autobiographical Commentaries on the Gallic Wars. British cultural critic Matthew Arnold praised both Grant and his book in an 1886 essay. Twain, however, felt Arnold's tone was condescending, and the two authors feuded until Arnold's death in 1888. Writer Gertrude Stein also admired the book, saying she could not think of Grant without weeping. The Memoirs quickly became a best seller.

Ulysses S. Grant sought to deliver his moral, political, economic and social argument for waging the war against the South in his Personal Memoirs. As the commander of the Union army and a two-term president, he had a unique perspective on the war that interested both the public and historical scholars, as they wanted to hear his side of the story. Although he was a clear figure in the public eye, Grant was unknown to many people. After the war, Grant's close colleague, General William T. Sherman remarked that, although he had known Grant for decades, "to me he is a mystery, and I believe he is a mystery to himself." In his Personal Memoirs, Grant portrayed himself as representative character of the North. In volume 1, he describes his family background and points to his simple upbringing as the reason for his solid, restrained virtues of a normal Northerner.

Grant goes to the point of declaring himself as "unmilitary" while continually stressing his simple nature. Grant stated that he did not even want to attend West Point, only going because his father thought it would be best, as Grant believed "a military life had no charms for me." Grant wrote of his participation in the Mexican War of 1846–1848, a war he did not support. Grant believed it was very unjust for the larger, stronger United States to pick on a weaker country as they were doing.

Grant used his Personal Memoirs as a way to respond to negative criticism immediately following the war, especially present in his description of the Battle of Shiloh. The two leading generals of the Union army at Shiloh were Grant and General Don Carlos Buell and they had very differing accounts of the battle. Many criticized Grant for being tremendously unprepared and Buell goes as far as to credit himself for the victory, while Grant proclaims the opposite story, stating the Union win was inevitable. Grant was able to use this book to portray his own personal memories of the events of the war and dispute any negative press he may have received.

Grant also used his Personal Memoirs to explain his battlefield action and his motives for the way he led. After the war, Grant was portrayed as a ruthless leader who stopped at nothing to make sure the South was destroyed. However, Grant felt this was a harsh evaluation and sought to improve the public opinion of himself and defend the fact he believed he was a simple and fair man. Grant felt he was being abused by newspaper coverage that he believed was shoddy, inaccurate and defeatist. He stated, "Up to the Battle of Shiloh, I, as well as thousands of other citizens, believed that the rebellion against the Government would collapse suddenly and soon, if decisive victory could be gained over any of its armies. … After Shiloh, I gave up all idea of saving the Union except by complete conquest. … The Northern troops were never more cruel than the necessities of war required."

Geoffrey Perret, the author of Ulysses S. Grant: Soldier and President staunchly disagreed with Grant's assertion that he was acting out of necessity and declared Grant's wartime conquests were against his Northern virtues. In Perret's eyes, Grant was "above all a soldier, and not a reluctant one." Perret argued that Grant in fact liked West Point, had few reservations at the time about the Mexican War and was a very good junior officer. Perret backs these accusations with the fact Grant, while appointed the General-in-Chief, "evolved the future of the United States Army" by applying "maximum firepower, maximum mobility" while relying on "the wide envelopment" as his principal form of maneuver.

Given over a century of favorable literary analysis, according to reviewer Mark Perry, the Memoirs are "the most significant work" of American non-fiction.

=== Mark Twain's opinion ===
I had been comparing the memoirs with Caesar's Commentaries. …I was able to say in all sincerity, that the same high merits distinguished both books—clarity of statement, directness, simplicity, unpretentiousness, manifest truthfulness, fairness and justice toward friend and foe alike, soldierly candor and frankness, and soldierly avoidance of flowery speech. I placed the two books side by side upon the same high level, and I still think that they belonged there.

=== Modern annotated editions ===
External videos
- Discussion of the annotated edition of Grant's memoirs with John Marszalek, Craig L. Symonds, and Frank J. Williams, November 17, 2018, C-SPAN

On October 16, 2017, the first completely annotated edition of the memoirs was published by The Belknap Press of Harvard University Press. Titled The Personal Memoirs of Ulysses S. Grant: The Complete Annotated Edition, it was edited by John F. Marszalek (Executive Director of the Ulysses S. Grant Association from 2008 to 2022), with David S. Nolen and Louie P. Gallo. They completed the project in order to contextualize the memoirs for the modern reader.

In 2018, The Annotated Memoirs of Ulysses S. Grant, edited by Elizabeth D. Samet, was published by Liveright Publishing Corporation.

== See also ==
- Bibliography of Ulysses S. Grant § Primary sources
- Bibliography of the American Civil War
- Personal Memoirs of Julia Dent Grant
