= Wilton, New York =

Wilton
- Town
- Town of Wilton
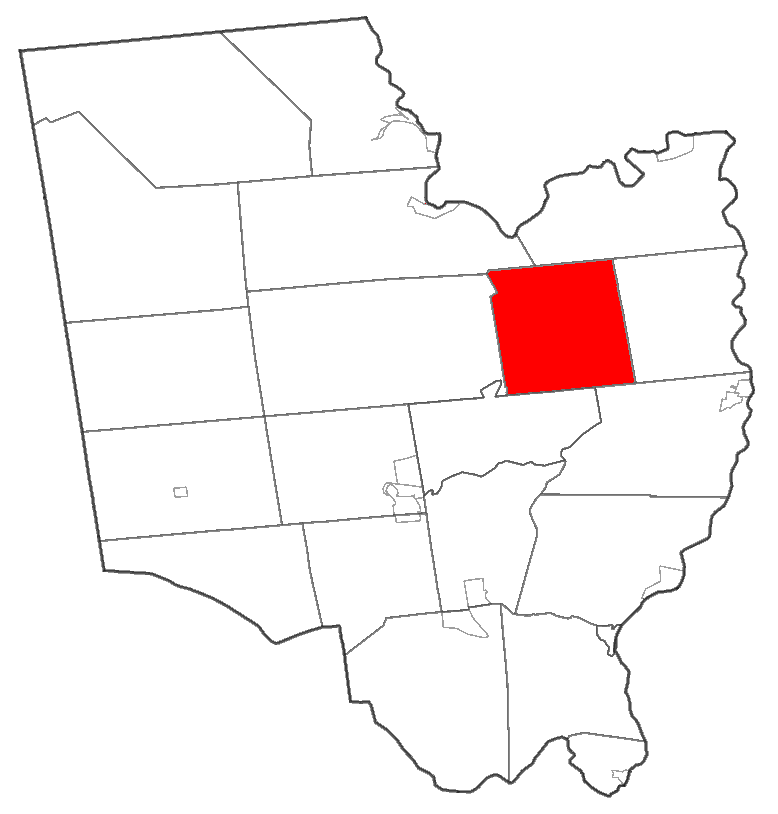
- Map highlighting Wilton's location within Saratoga County.

- Location within the state of New York
- Coordinates: 43°8′33″N 73°43′58″W
- Country: United States
- State: New York
- County: Saratoga

Area
  - Total: 35.95 sq mi (93.12 km^{2})
  - Land: 35.83 sq mi (92.81 km^{2})
  - Water: 0.12 sq mi (0.31 km^{2})
- Elevation: 325 ft (99 m)

Population (2020)
  - Total: 17,361
  - Estimate (2021): 17,468
  - Density: 485/sq mi (187.1/km^{2})
- Time zone: UTC-5 (Eastern (EST))
  - Summer (DST): UTC-4 (EDT)
- ZIP code: 12831, 12833, 12866
- Area code: 518 838
- FIPS code: 36-82403
- GNIS feature ID: 0979647

Wilton is a town in Saratoga County, New York, United States. The population was 17,361 at the 2020 census.

The Town of Wilton is in the northeastern part of the county, northeast of Saratoga Springs, which it borders. The town is a local economic hub, and hosts much suburban development, especially compared to its neighboring towns.

== History ==
The region, once called "Palmertown," was first settled by Europeans around 1764. The Town of Wilton was created in 1818 from the Town of Northumberland.

The Grant Cottage State Historic Site is located in Wilton, in an area known as Mount McGregor, which is the highest peak of the Palmertown Range, mostly north of Wilton. This site is the place where Ulysses S. Grant died of throat cancer in 1885 just after completing his memoirs.

A narrow-gauge railway built in 1882, the Saratoga, Mount McGregor and Lake George Railroad, ran through Wilton.

Throughout the 1990s the town took advantage of its proximity to Saratoga Springs, by expanding suburban and commercial areas. The Wilton Mall is located in the town, as well as many large retail stores off of exit 15 on I-87. This economic development damaged downtown Saratoga at the time, however today Saratoga has recovered.

== Geography ==
According to the United States Census Bureau, the town has a total area of 36.0 square miles (93 km^{2}), of which 35.9 square miles (93 km^{2}) is land and 0.1 square miles (0.26 km^{2}) (0.25%) is water.

U.S. Route 9 and the Adirondack Northway (Interstate 87) are parallel north–south highways. New York State Route 50 is a north–south highway in the eastern part of Wilton.

The town is mostly located on the flat plain surrounding the Hudson River.

=== Communities ===
- Ballard Corners – A hamlet by the eastern town line on NY-50 at the junction of County Road 33.
- Barnes Corners – A location in the southeastern part of the town on NY-50.
- Dimmick Corners – A location in the northeastern part of the town on County Road 32.
- Gurn Spring – A hamlet southeast of Wilton village on County Road 33.
- Kings Station – A hamlet south of Wilton village on US-9.
- Loughberry Lake – A small lake in the southwestern section of Wilton.
- Mt. McGregor Correctional Facility – A New York state medium security prison at the northern town line (now closed). On its grounds lies the Grant Cottage.
- Travers Corners – A hamlet south of Wilton village.
- Wilton – The hamlet of Wilton in located on US-9 at the junction with County Roads 101, 32, 33, and 34, in the northern part of the town.
- Hunters Wood – A community located along southern Loughberry Lake.
- Birch Acres – A neighborhood located along Jones Road.
- Vincek Corner – Located along the junction of Jones Road, and Smith Bridge Road.

== Demographics ==
Historical population
Census	Pop.	Note	%±
1820	1,293		—
1830	1,303		0.8%
1840	1,438		10.4%
1850	1,458		1.4%
1860	1,499		2.8%
1870	1,204		−19.7%
1880	1,118		−7.1%
1890	1,116		−0.2%
1900	989		−11.4%
1910	908		−8.2%
1920	826		−9.0%
1930	997		20.7%
1940	1,231		23.5%
1950	1,407		14.3%
1960	1,902		35.2%
1970	2,984		56.9%
1980	7,221		142.0%
1990	10,623		47.1%
2000	12,511		17.8%
2010	16,173		29.3%
2020	17,361		7.3%
2021 (est.)	17,468		0.6%
U.S. Decennial Census

As of the census of 2020, there were 17,361 people.

== Government ==
The Town Council is a five-member legislative body, consisting of the supervisor and four councilmen. The supervisor is the presiding officer of the council, the chief administrator of town affairs, and the town's legislative representative on the Saratoga County Board of Supervisors. Other elected officials are the Town Clerk, Superintendent of Highways and two Town Justices. The supervisor is John Lant; the town clerk is Susan Baldwin.

== Notable people ==
- Henry D. Barron, Wisconsin jurist and legislator
- Ulysses S. Grant, U.S. President (died there)
- Edgar T. Brackett, politician and businessman
- Tabor B. Reynolds, physician and politician
- Seneca Ray Stoddard, photographer and naturalist
- Roy J. McDonald, NY Senator

== See also ==
- Grant Cottage State Historic Site
- Maple Avenue Middle School
- Battle of Wilton (New York)
