= Mount McGregor (mountain) =

Mountain in New York, US

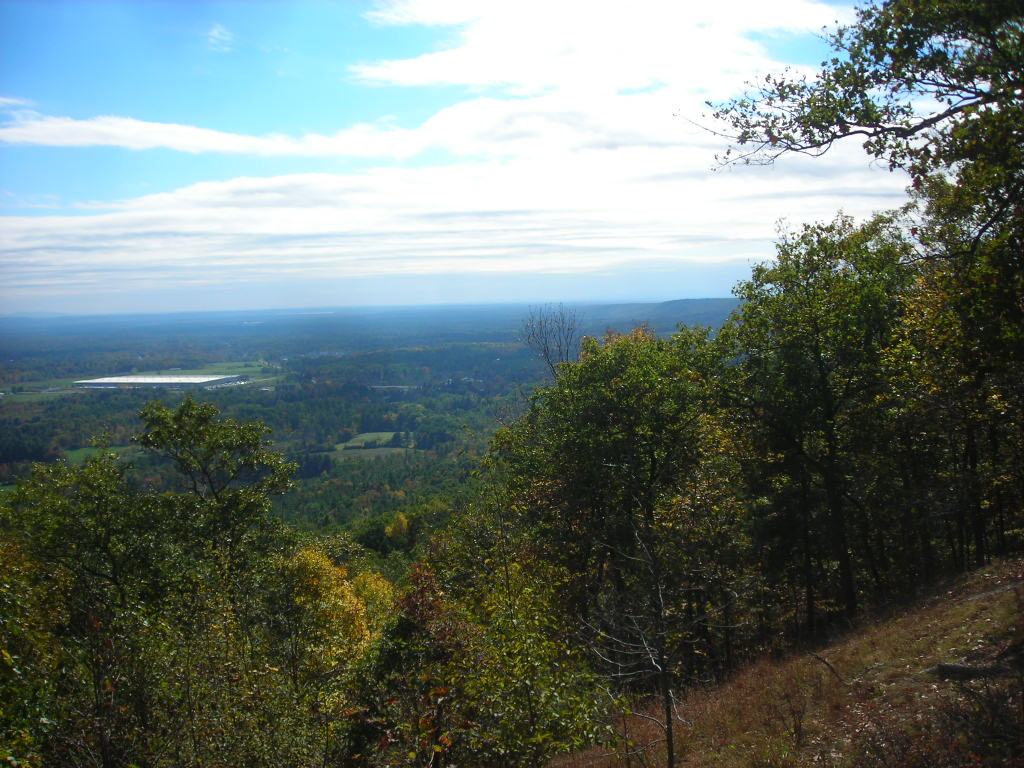
- View from Mount McGregor eastern overlook in 2007

Highest point
- Elevation: 1,070 ft (330 m)
- Coordinates: 43°12′03″N 73°44′32″W

Geography
- Location within New York Adirondack Park
- Location: Saratoga County, New York, U.S.
- Parent range: Adirondack Mountains
- Topo map: USGS Corinth quadrangle

Mount McGregor is a mountain in Saratoga County, New York in the towns of Wilton, Moreau, and Corinth. It is one of the principal peaks of the Palmertown Range.

The Palmertown range is the most easterly of the five great mountain-chains which traverse the great wilderness. The Palmertown range begins on Lake Champlain, near Ticonderoga, and running down on both sides of Lake George, crosses the Hudson above Glen's Falls, and running through the town of Wilton, ends in the high ground of North Broadway, in Saratoga Springs.

There are two lakes on the mountain, Lake Bonita and Lake Anna, which were previously used for fishing.

== History ==
The mountain was originally called Palmertown Mountain, named by a band of Native Americans who moved to the area from Massachusetts escaping from the aftermath of King Philip's War. It was renamed after Duncan McGregor purchased it for back taxes and built a hotel called the Mountain House in 1876.

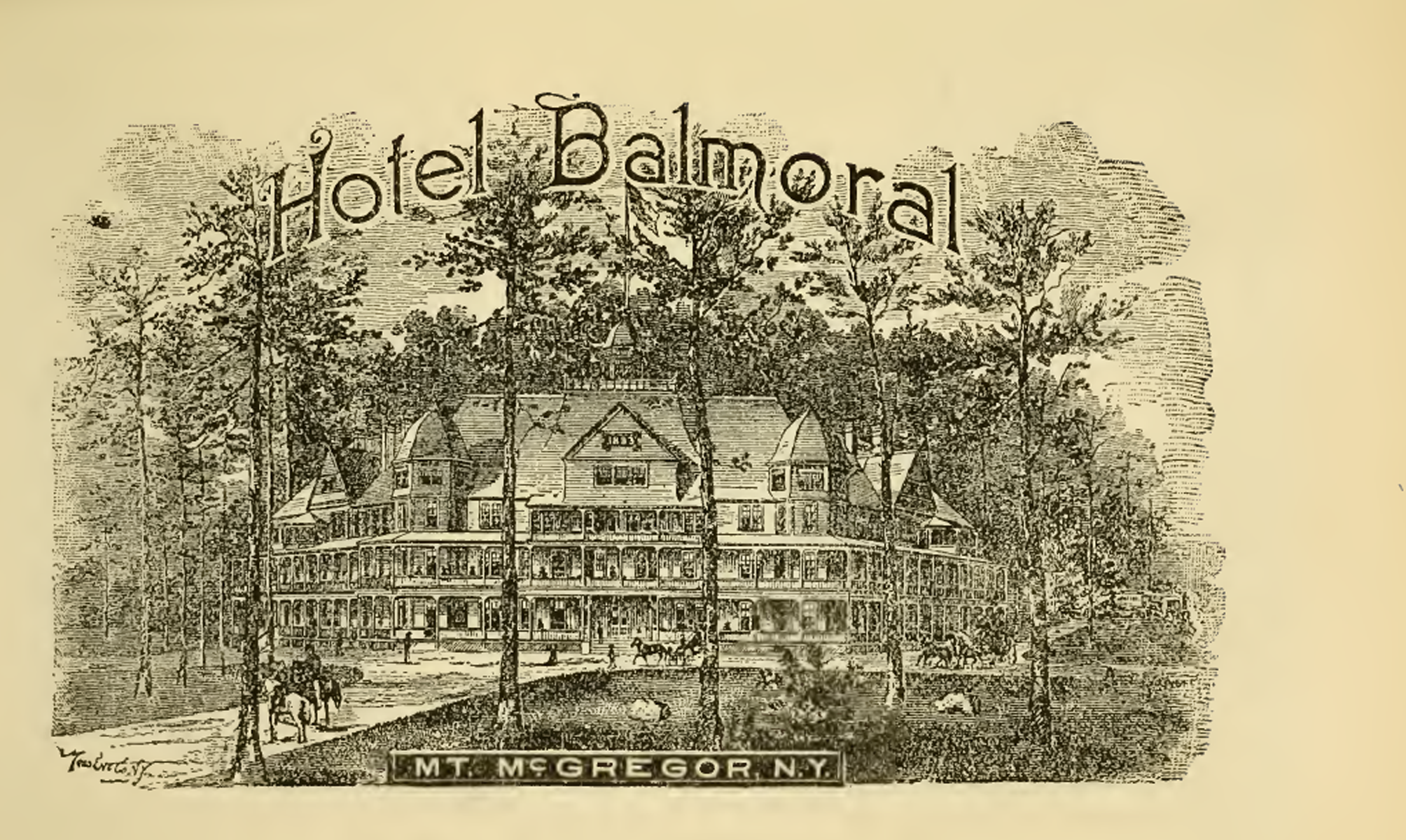
Hotel Balmoral

In 1881 McGregor sold the mountain to the Saratoga, Mount McGregor and Lake George Railroad, owned by Joseph William Drexel. Drexel constructed a narrow-gauge railroad from Saratoga Springs and built the Hotel Balmoral at the summit with accommodation for 300 guests. In 1897 the hotel burned to the ground.

In 1885 Drexel loaned his friend, seriously ill former president Ulysses S. Grant, the use of his personal cottage on the mountain. Here Grant spent the last six weeks of his life struggling to finish his memoirs before he died. The cottage, preserved exactly as it was at his death, is now the Grant Cottage State Historic Site and is listed on the National Register of Historic Places.

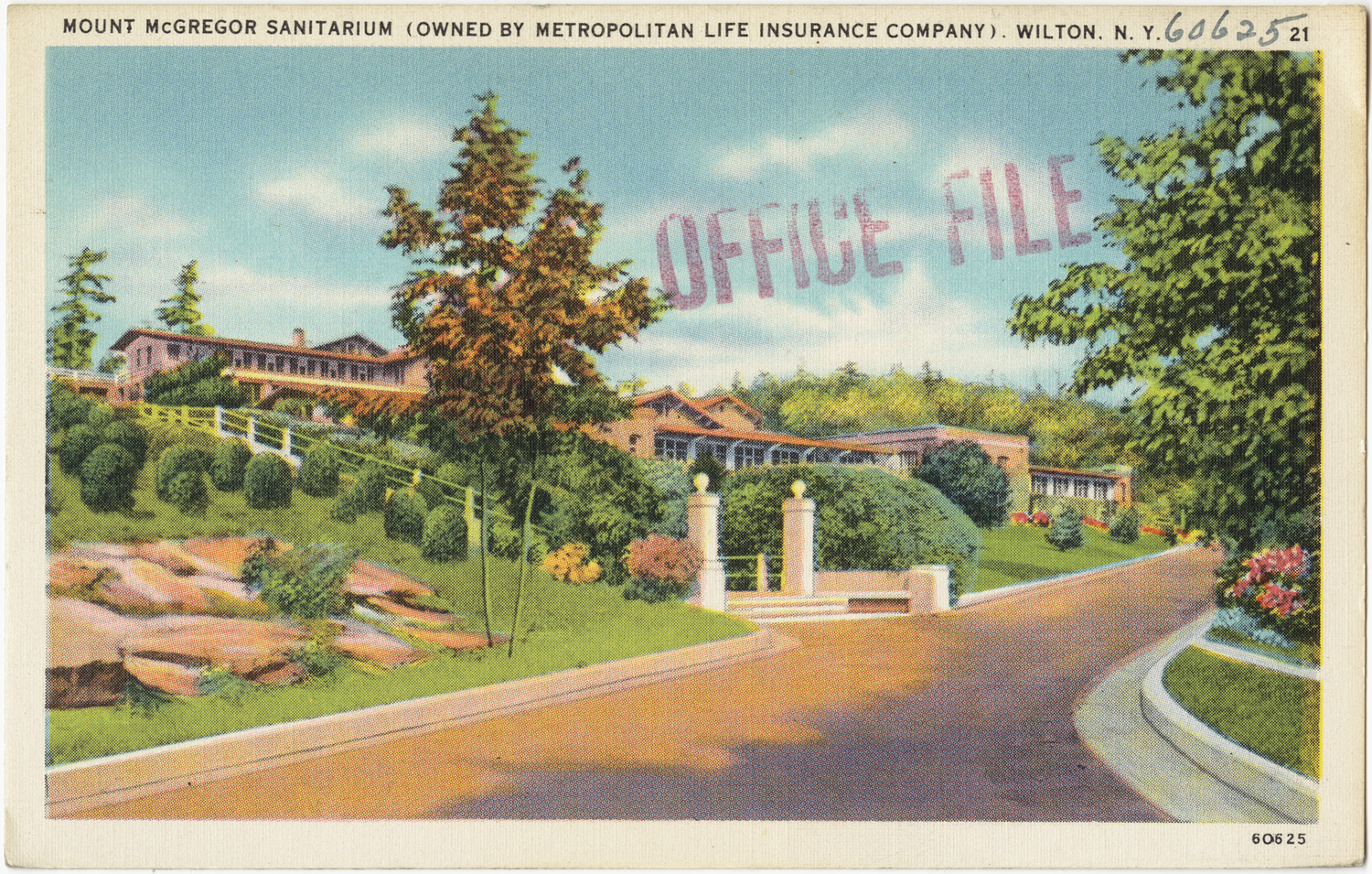
Mount McGregor Sanitarium

The Metropolitan Life Insurance Company purchased the 1,200 acres (490 ha) of Mt. McGregor to build a tuberculosis sanitarium for up to 350 patients, eventually comprising 30 buildings costing around $3 million. The sanitarium opened in 1914.

In 1945 New York State purchased the facility from Metropolitan for convalescing veterans of World War II. With the decline in the need for veterans' services the facility was converted for use of the developmentally disabled, and in 1976 converted again to a prison, the Mount McGregor Correctional Facility. In 2013 Governor Andrew Cuomo announced plans to close the prison. The Mount McGregor Correctional Facility officially closed in July 2014.

== Accessibility ==
Grant Cottage State Historic Site continues to operate, but access to the area is restricted to Historic Site visitors during operating hours only. Over 700 acres (280 ha) of former corrections property was transferred to Moreau Lake State Park and there are new trails that access the new Lake Bonita parcel. The 325-acre (132 ha) former Correctional Facility property is open to redevelopment proposals.
