= Moreau Lake State Park =

State park in Saratoga County, New York

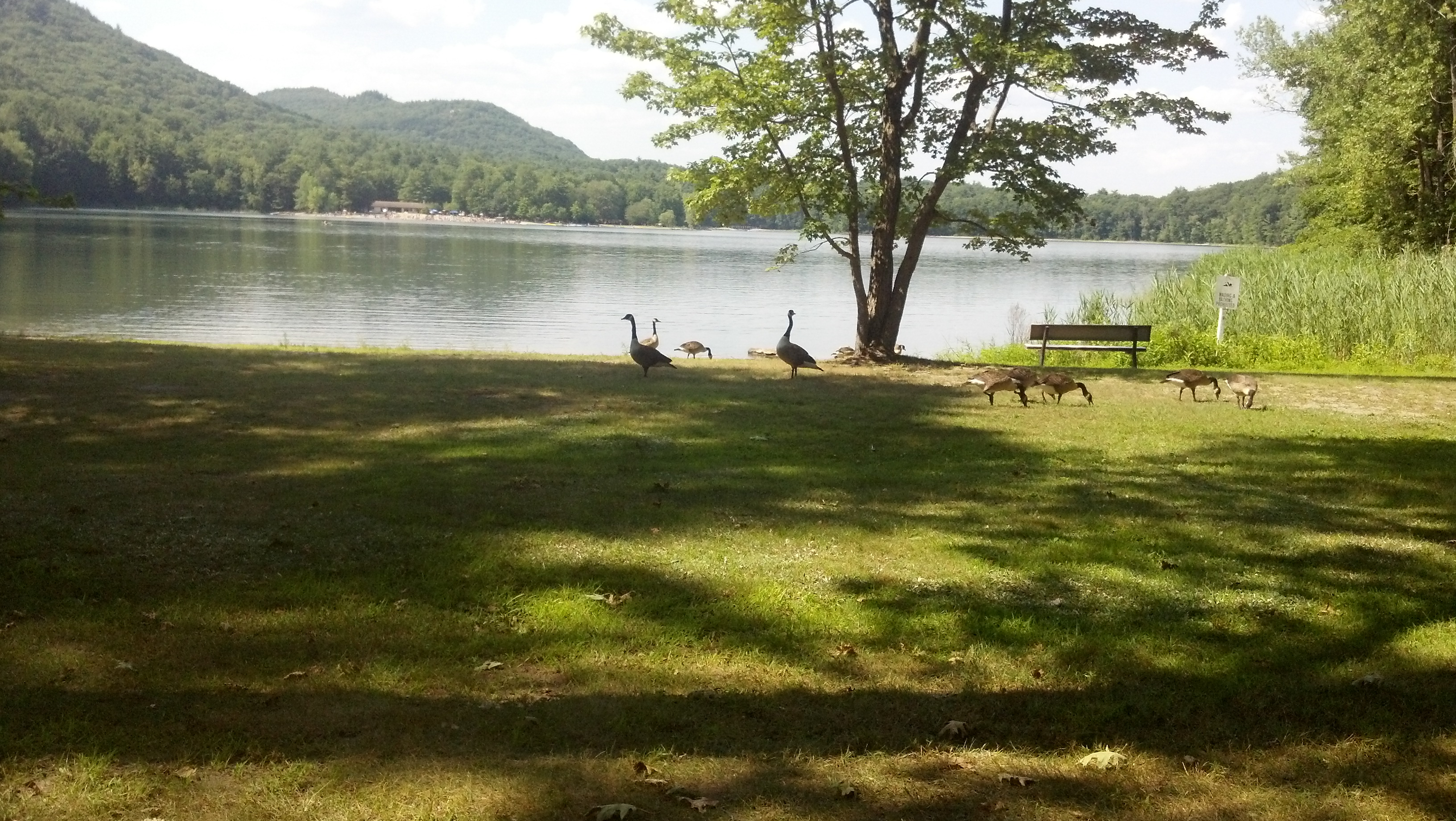

- Location within New York Location within the United States
- Nearest city: Glens Falls, New York
- Coordinates: 43°14′04″N 73°42′49″W
- Governing body: New York State Office of Parks, Recreation and Historic Preservation

Moreau Lake State Park is a 6,250-acre (2,530 ha) state park in Saratoga County, New York, United States.

The park is located in the southwest part of the town of Moreau on US 9 off Interstate 87. It has over 20 mi (32 km) of hiking trails.

It is located near the Hudson River.

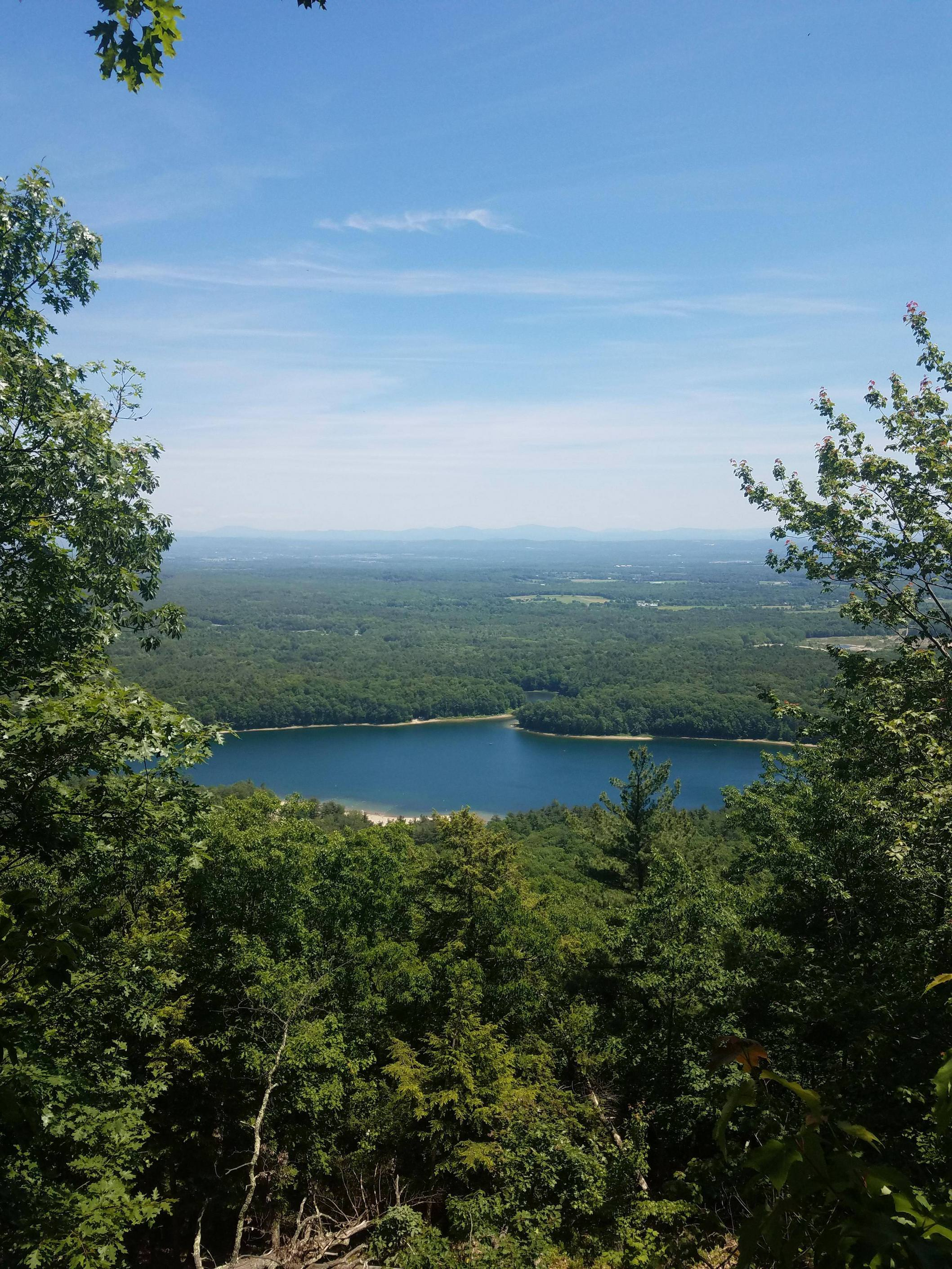
Moreau Lake on June 12, 2018

== See also ==
- Mount McGregor
- List of New York state parks
