= Moreau, New York =

Moreau
- Town
- Town of Moreau
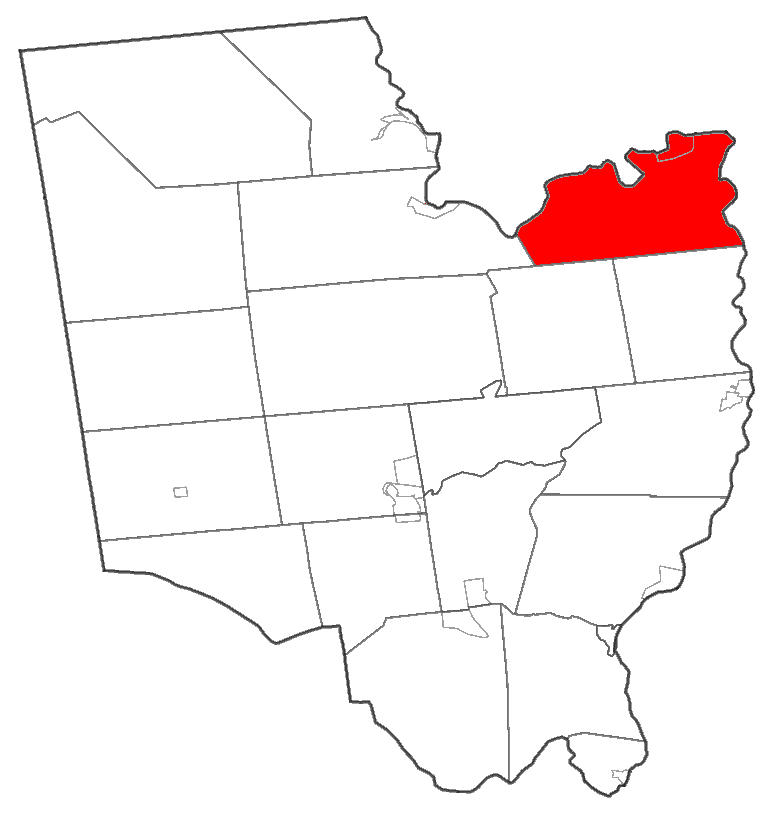
- Map highlighting Moreau's location within Saratoga County.

- Location within the state of New York
- Coordinates: 43°14′22″N 73°40′04″W
- Country: United States
- State: New York
- County: Saratoga
- Named for: Jean Victor Moreau

Area
  - Total: 43.58 sq mi (112.87 km^{2})
  - Land: 41.93 sq mi (108.61 km^{2})
  - Water: 1.64 sq mi (4.26 km^{2})
- Elevation: 348 ft (106 m)

Population (2020)
  - Total: 16,202
  - Density: 386.36/sq mi (149.18/km^{2})
- Time zone: UTC-5 (Eastern (EST))
  - Summer (DST): UTC-4 (EDT)
- ZIP codes: 12803, 12828, 12831
- Area code: 518
- FIPS code: 36-48318
- GNIS feature ID: 0979236
- Website: Town website

Moreau is a town in Saratoga County, New York, United States. The population was 16,202 at the 2020 census. The town is located in the northeast part of the county, north of Saratoga Springs. Moreau is named after Jean Victor Moreau, a French general, who visited the area just before the town was formed. The town contains a village called South Glens Falls.

== History ==
The town, although part of the town of Northumberland until 1805, was first settled around 1766 at what is now the village of South Glens Falls.

Ulysses S. Grant, former President and army general, spent the last weeks of his life finishing his memoirs at what is now the Grant Cottage State Historic Site. The cottage on Mount McGregor was surrounded by over 1000 acres of beautiful natural vistas, and was visited by many thousands of Civil War veterans in the years following his death. The locale has had many uses over the decades, and currently the cottage is on the grounds of the former Mount McGregor Correctional Facility.

The Historical Society of Moreau and South Glens Falls is housed in the Parks-Bentley House, added to the National Register of Historic Places in 1994.

The Royal Blockhouse site was listed on the National Register of Historic Places in 2012.

== Geography ==
According to the United States Census Bureau, the town has a total area of 43.6 square miles (113 km^{2}), of which 42.2 square miles (109 km^{2}) is land and 1.5 square miles (3.9 km^{2}) (3.32%) is water.

The town's entire northern and eastern boundaries are established by the Hudson River. The eastern town line, formed by the river, is the border of Washington County. The northern town line is the border of Warren County.

The Adirondack Northway (Interstate 87) and US Route 9 are north–south highways which pass through the town. New York State Route 32 intersects US-9 at the hamlet of Fernwood, and New York State Route 197 intersects NY-32 at the hamlet of Reynolds Corners.

== Demographics ==
Historical population
Census	Pop.	Note	%±
1820	1,549		—
1830	1,690		9.1%
1840	1,576		−6.7%
1850	1,834		16.4%
1860	2,210		20.5%
1870	2,256		2.1%
1880	2,555		13.3%
1890	2,698		5.6%
1900	2,999		11.2%
1910	3,340		11.4%
1920	3,222		−3.5%
1930	4,471		38.8%
1940	4,930		10.3%
1950	6,065		23.0%
1960	8,406		38.6%
1970	10,411		23.9%
1980	11,188		7.5%
1990	13,022		16.4%
2000	13,826		6.2%
2010	14,728		6.5%
2020	16,202		10.0%
U.S. Decennial Census

At the 2000 census there were 13,826 people, 5,128 households, and 3,543 families living in the town. The population density was 327.9 inhabitants per square mile (126.6/km^{2}). There were 5,395 housing units at an average density of 128.0 per square mile (49.4/km^{2}). The racial makeup of the town was 94.07% white, 3.58% African American, .20% Native American, .38% Asian, .02% Pacific Islander, 1.03% from other races, and .72% from two or more races. Hispanic or Latino of any race were 2.09%.

Of the 5,128 households 32.8% had children under the age of 18 living with them, 55.4% were married couples living together, 10.1% had a female householder with no husband present, and 30.9% were non-families. 24.4% of households were one person and 10.8% were one person aged 65 or older. The average household size was 2.53 and the average family size was 3.01.

The age distribution was 23.9% under the age of 18, 6.9% from 18 to 24, 34.0% from 25 to 44, 22.5% from 45 to 64, and 12.8% 65 or older. The median age was 37 years. For every 100 females, there were 107.3 males. For every 100 females age 18 and over, there were 107.3 males.

The median household income was $40,536 and the median family income was $47,788. Males had a median income of $35,660 versus $25,321 for females. The per capita income for the town was $19,492. About 4.7% of families and 7.1% of the population were below the poverty line, including 6.6% of those under age 18 and 8.3% of those age 65 or over.

== Communities and locations in Moreau ==
- Bakers Falls – a small waterfall on the Hudson River near Fenimore.
- Clarks Corner – A location in the southeastern part of the town on NY-32. It was named after early physician Billy Clark.
- Ashford Estates – A neighborhood community off Rt. 9 in the southern tier of the town.
- Fenimore – A hamlet east of South Glens Falls.
- Fernwood – A hamlet starting from the south of the village of South Glens Falls, running along Moreau's western border of the Hudson River to the north side of Nolan Road, then across Route 9 along the north side of Bluebird Road to Main Street Ext. then back to the village line.
- Fortsville – A hamlet in the southwestern part of the town.
- Grant Cottage State Historic Site
- Moreau Lake – A lake located west of Fortsville.
- Moreau Lake State Park – A state park in the southwestern part of the town.
- Mount McGregor Correctional Facility (closed) – A New York State prison by the western part of the town.
- Reynolds Corners – A hamlet south of South Glens Falls on NY-32 at NY-197.
- South Glens Falls – A village located by the northern town line on US-9, adjacent to the Hudson River.
