= Personal Memoirs of Julia Dent Grant =

Memoir by Julia Grant

The Personal Memoirs of Julia Dent Grant (Mrs. Ulysses S. Grant)
- Author: Julia Grant
- Genre: Autobiographical memoir
- Published: 1975
- Publisher: Southern Illinois University Press
- ISBN: 0809314428

The Personal Memoirs of Julia Dent Grant (Mrs. Ulysses S. Grant) is a book by Julia Grant, the first lady of the United States and wife of Ulysses S. Grant. Though the book's initial manuscript was written in the 1890s, it was not published until 1975, nearly 73 years after Grant's death. Upon publication, the book received mixed reviews from critics, with some appreciating its description of the author's life and insight into life in the Victorian era. Others criticized the book as un-revealing and "not very insightful".

== Background ==
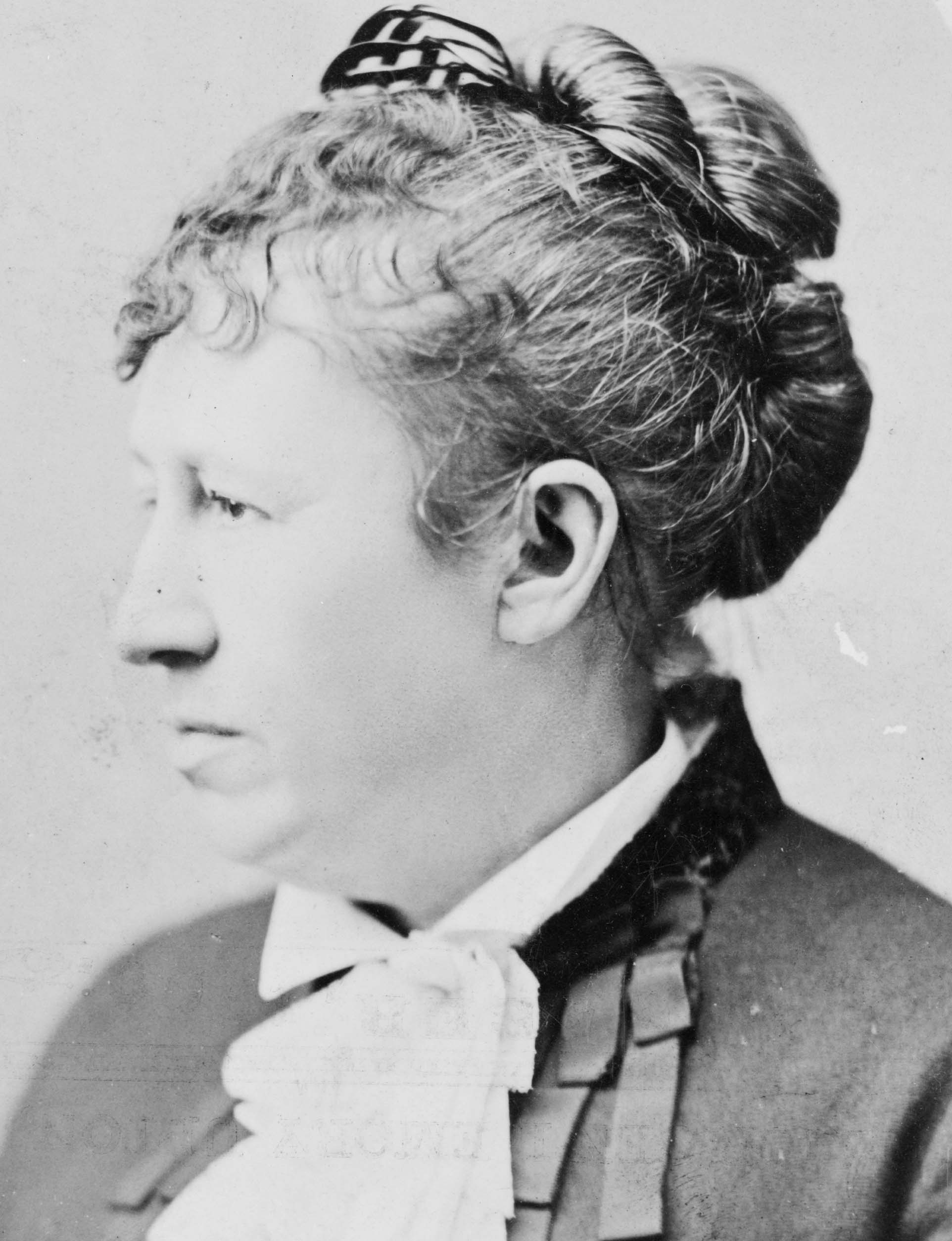
Julia Dent Grant

Julia Dent was born on January 26, 1826, in St. Louis, Missouri US, and grew up in a well-off family who owned thirty slaves. She first met Ulysses S. Grant through her brother, Fred, as they attended West Point together. Julia and Ulysses were married on August 22, 1848; they would have four children: Frederick Dent Grant, Ulysses Simpson Grant Jr., Ellen Wrenshall Grant, and Jesse Root Grant. Ulysses served in the United States Army and resigned in 1854 to return to his family. During the American Civil War from 1861 to 1865, Julia traveled over 10,000 miles (16,000 km) to be with her husband as he rose to the role of Commanding General of the United States Army. When Ulysses was elected president in 1868, she became first lady. She played a significant role in the position.

== Writing and publication ==
Julia Grant's husband wrote the Personal Memoirs of U. S. Grant, published in 1885 soon after his death. Grant eventually earned $450,000 in royalties from the book, which was very well received, both critically and by the public. She soon began giving her son, Frederick, notes on her life, which he recorded. The notes then led her to begin writing a memoir of her own. Writing it served as a "panacea for loneliness, a tonic for old age" and she soon "preferred writing to eating or driving or seeing friends." At the time, she did not intend to publish the memoir, telling The New York World in 1890 "I had no idea of publishing it". However, she soon changed her mind and began seeking a publisher for the book. She rejected several offers because, as historian John Y. Simon said, "great profits from her husband's book created an unrealistic view of the value of her own." The offers included one to use subscription to sell the book and another by Elliott Shepard that would have provided $25,000 in advance. In November 1901, she asked Andrew Carnegie to purchase the memoir for $125,000. The memoirs were the first written by a first lady of the United States.

The book was still unpublished upon Julia Grant's death on December 14, 1902. The memoirs remained largely private until John Simon was allowed to edit them and they were published by Southern Illinois University Press in 1975.

== Critical reception ==
David Lindsay gave the book a favorable review in Civil War History, writing that the book presents Julia as "a lively, likable human being" and he felt that "Julia Grant's Memoirs complement the General's", particularly praising her description of Grant's trip around the world. He concludes that "we [are] indebted to Julia Grant for relating candidly what life in the Grant household was like, the texture of her marriage and the private side of her husband and herself". In the Atlantic Monthly, Phoebe Adams calls the book an "artless autobiography", noting the "fascinating behind-the-scenes detail" and the fact that there is not "a word of complaint about the roller-coaster Grant fortunes".

Jeffery Lant in The Great Lakes Review felt that the book was not "at all revealing" and "not very insightful". He concluded that the book was "interesting" as a portrait of how a well-off woman lived in the mid-to-late 1800s, and the only reason the memoirs have importance is because they serve as a reminder of "how important the trivial is and how often historians have neglected and overlooked it". Vernon Bullough considers that its focus on trivial aspects of life may be because Julia intended her memoirs to supplement her husband's. A 1989 review by James Rawley of a reprinted edition of the book in the Illinois Historical Journal wrote that the book is a "study in Victorian domesticity" and noted that the book is decidedly "apolitical". He felt the memoirs to "lack sensible proportion", with a heavy focus on her pre-war years and less about the Civil War and presidency. He feels the account of their world tour is "tedious" but concluded the book was "handsome and well-edited". Kathryn Kish Sklar called the book a "study in human conflict", while Kirkus Reviews bemoaned that "even on the parquet-and-bonnet level Julia gives so little satisfaction" and concluded: "thoroughly American, she is about as revealing of her period or herself as Mamie Eisenhower."
