= Jesse Root Grant (politician) =

American politician, child of Ulysses S. Grant (1858–1934)

Jesse Root Grant II
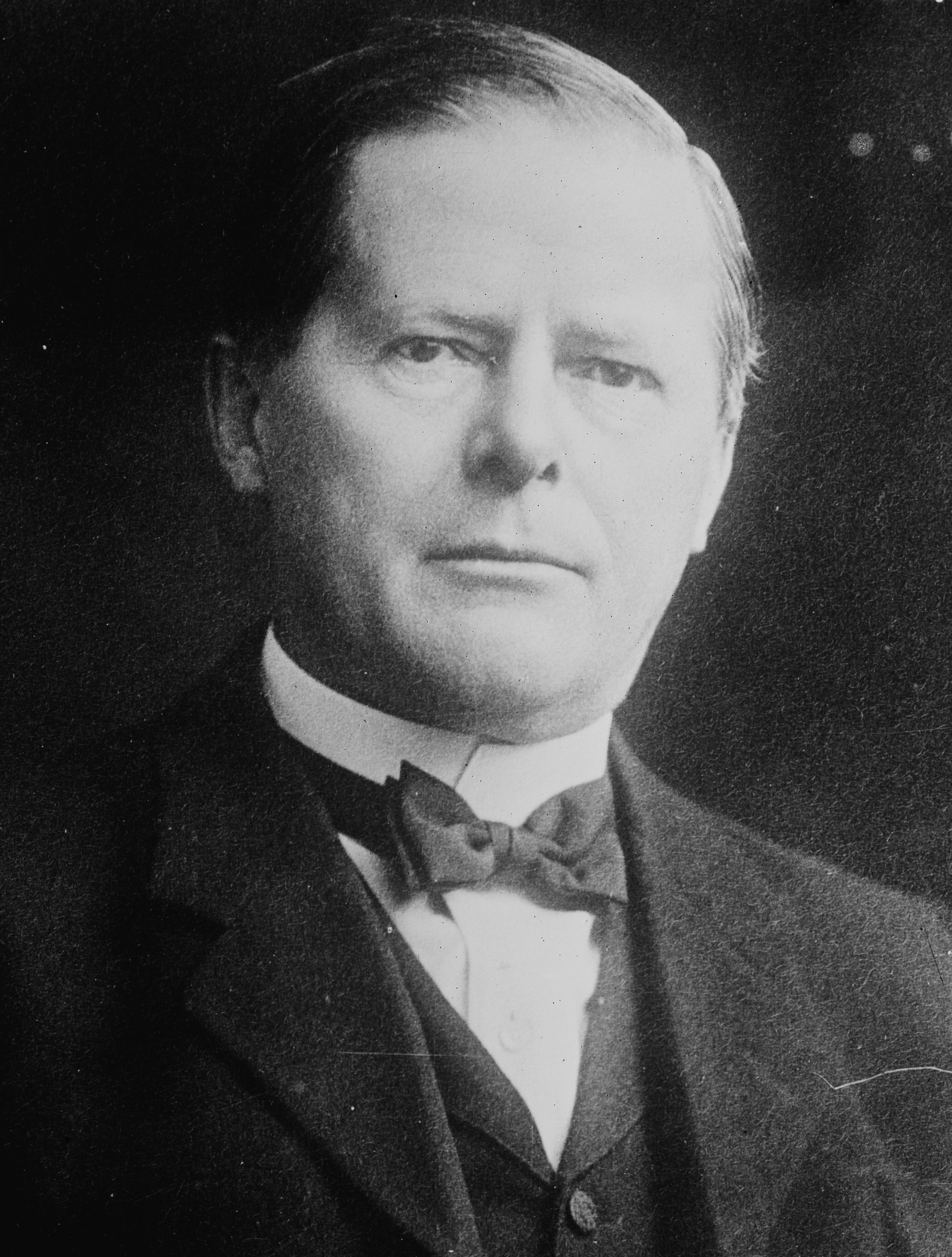

Personal details
- Born: February 6, 1858 near St. Louis, Missouri, U.S.
- Died: June 8, 1934 (aged 76) Los Altos, California, U.S.
- Party: Democratic
- Spouses: Elizabeth Chapman (m. 1880; div. 1918); Lillian Burns Wilkins (m. 1918)
- Children: 2, including Chapman Grant
- Parents: Ulysses S. Grant; Julia Dent Grant
- Relatives: Frederick Tracy Dent (uncle); Frederick Dent Grant (brother); Ulysses S. Grant Jr. (brother); Ellen Wrenshall Grant (sister); Julia Grant Cantacuzène (niece); Ulysses S. Grant III (nephew); Ulysses S. Grant IV (nephew)
- Education: Cornell University; Columbia Law School

Jesse Root Grant II (February 6, 1858 – June 8, 1934) was an American businessman. He was the youngest son of President Ulysses S. Grant and First Lady Julia Grant. He joined the Democratic Party and sought the party nomination for President, running against William Jennings Bryan in 1908. In 1925, he wrote a biography of his father.

== Biography ==
Jesse Root Grant II was born near St. Louis, Missouri to Ulysses S. Grant and Julia Grant. He was named after his grandfather Jesse Root Grant. He studied engineering at Cornell University and also attended Columbia Law School before settling in California. In addition to practicing law, he was involved in several mining ventures as an engineer, stockholder, board of directors member and corporate officer. For several years he managed his brother Ulysses Jr.'s U.S. Grant Hotel in San Diego. In the 1890s, he helped to develop Tia Juana, now Tijuana, Mexico, as a gambling resort.

In 1880, he married Elizabeth Chapman (1858-1945), daughter of William Chapman, one of the founders of the California Academy of Sciences. They had two children: Chapman Grant and Nellie Grant. In 1913, Grant sued for divorce while they were living in Goldfield, Nevada. Mrs. Grant strenuously fought his charges of desertion. She countersued, claiming he had deserted her and refused to support the family. The divorce was followed by the newspapers. When the divorce was finally granted in 1918, Grant married a widow, Lillian Burns Wilkins.

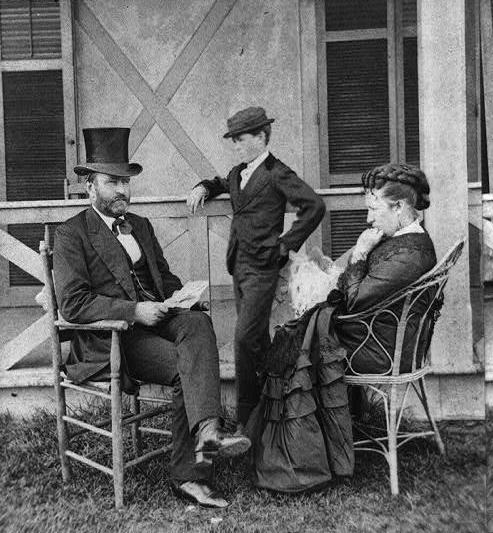
Jesse Grant with his parents, 1872

Grant died in Los Altos, California in 1934 and was buried at the cemetery at the Presidio of San Francisco. He was the last surviving child of Ulysses S. Grant.

== Political and literary career ==
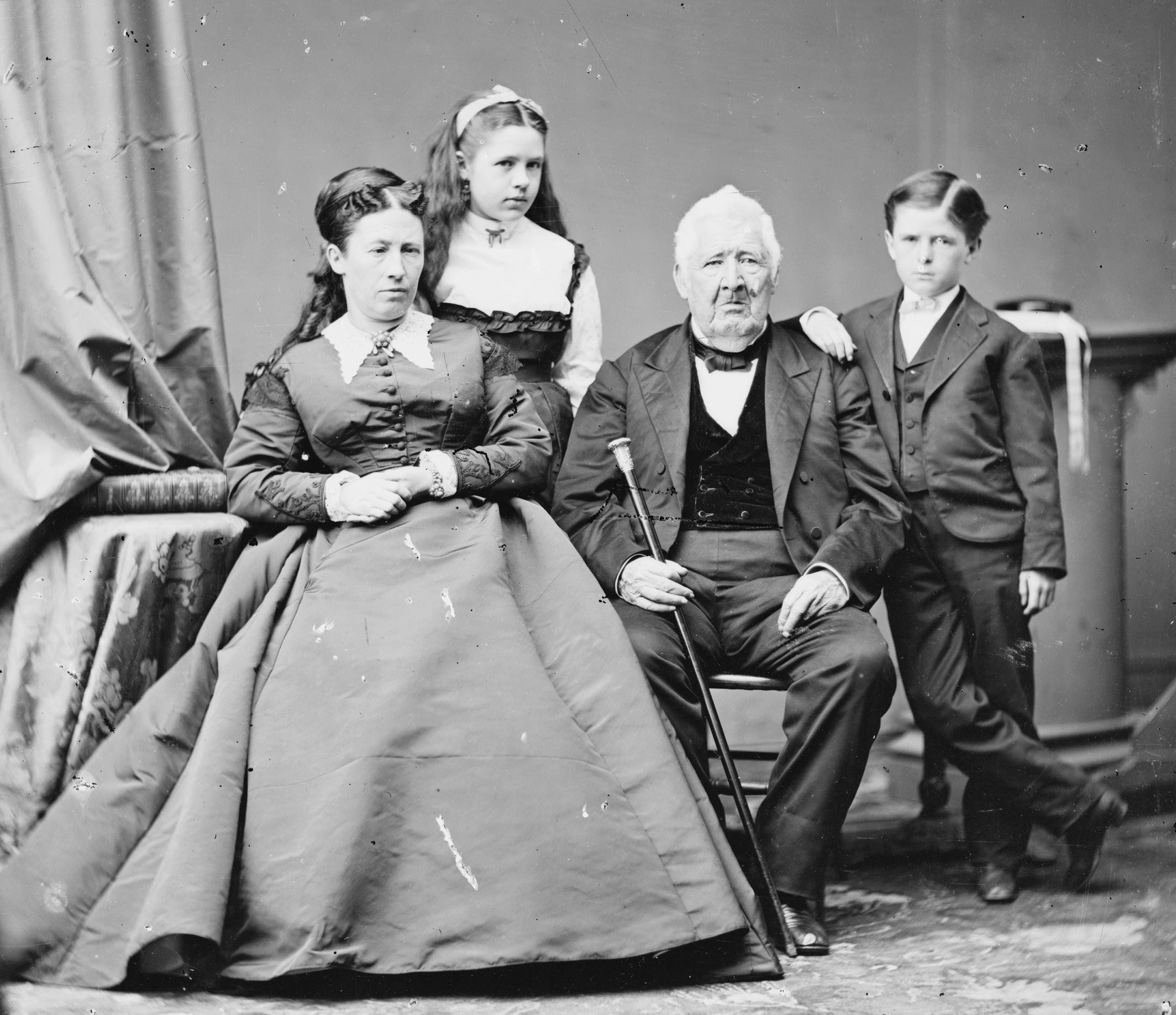
Julia Grant with daughter Nellie, son Jesse, and her father Frederick Dent

Grant joined the Democratic party and was a candidate for the Democratic presidential nomination in 1908, though he was not considered a viable contender. In 1925, he wrote a biography of his father, In the Days of My Father General Grant.
