= Sartoris (surname) =

Sartoris is an Italian language occupational surname for a tailor and may refer to:

- Algernon Edward Sartoris (1877–1928), American diplomat
- Joseph Martin Sartoris (1927–2025), American prelate of the Roman Catholic Church
- Peter Urban Sartoris (1767–1833), Swiss banker
