= Ulysses S. Grant Jr. =

American businessman and son of President Grant (1852–1929)

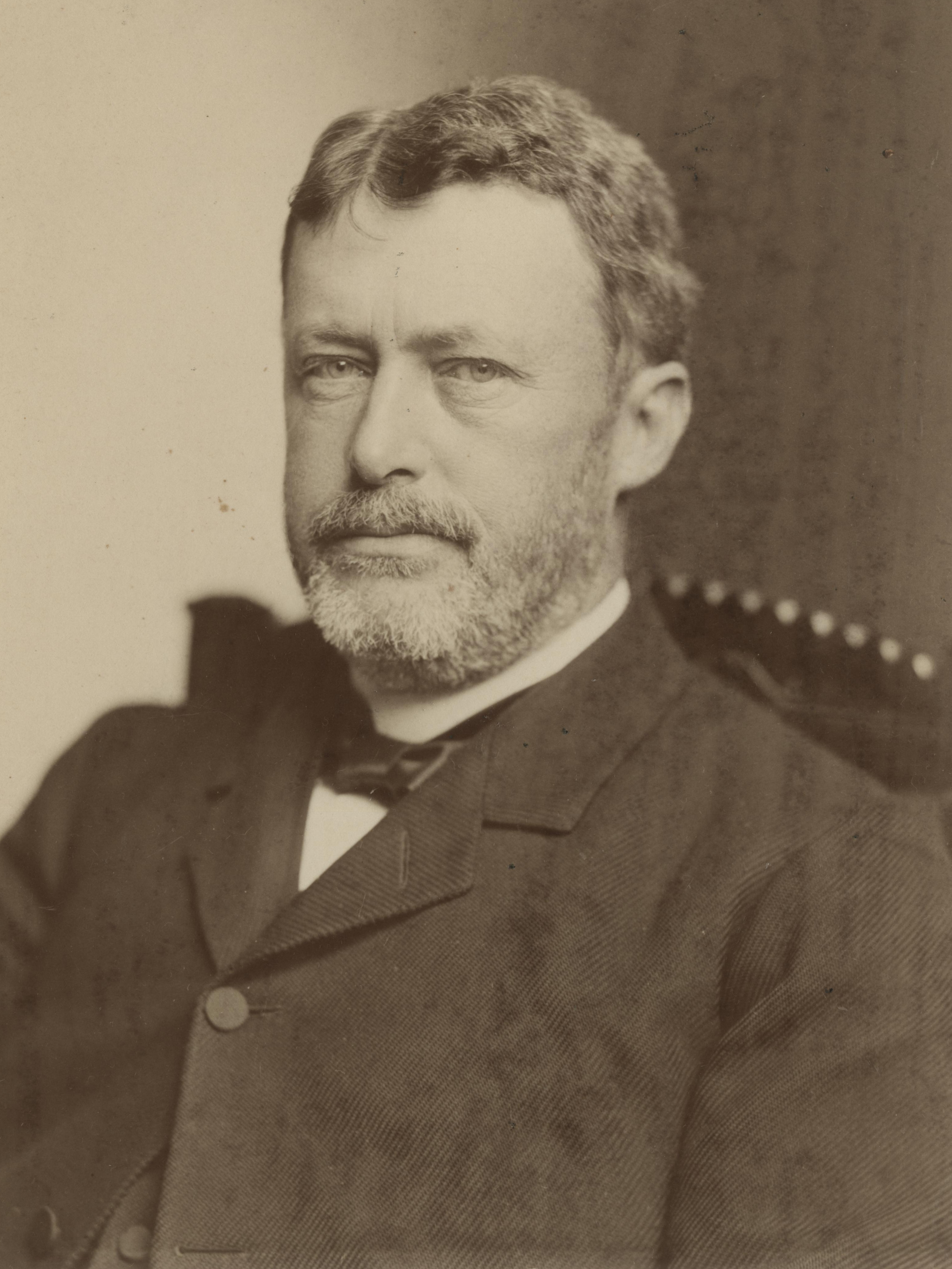
- Portrait by I. W. Taber, 1895

Private Secretary to the President
- In office February 7, 1876 – March 4, 1877
- President: Ulysses S. Grant
- Preceded by: Levi P. Luckey
- Succeeded by: Webb Hayes

Personal details
- Born: July 22, 1852 Bethel, Ohio, U.S.
- Died: September 25, 1929 (aged 77) Sandberg, California, U.S.
- Spouses: Fannie Josephine Chaffee (m. 1880; died 1909) America Workman Will (m. 1913)
- Children: 5. including Ulysses IV
- Parents: Ulysses S. Grant (father); Julia Grant (mother)
- Relatives: Frederick Dent Grant (brother); Nellie Grant (sister); Jesse Root Grant II (brother) Ulysses S. Grant III (nephew)
- Education: Harvard University (BA); Columbia University (LLB)
- Occupation: Attorney, entrepreneur
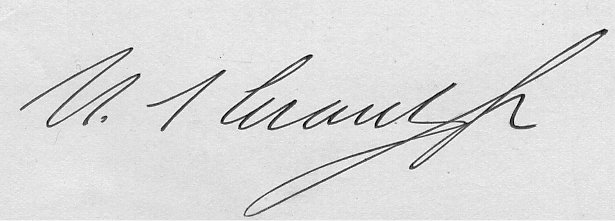
- Signature

Ulysses S. "Buck" Grant Jr. (July 22, 1852 – September 25, 1929) was an American attorney and entrepreneur. He was the second son of U.S. president Ulysses S. Grant.

== Early life and education ==
Ulysses S. Grant Jr. was born in Bethel, Ohio, on July 22, 1852. He graduated from Phillips Exeter Academy in 1870, Harvard University in 1874, and Columbia Law School in 1876.

== Career ==
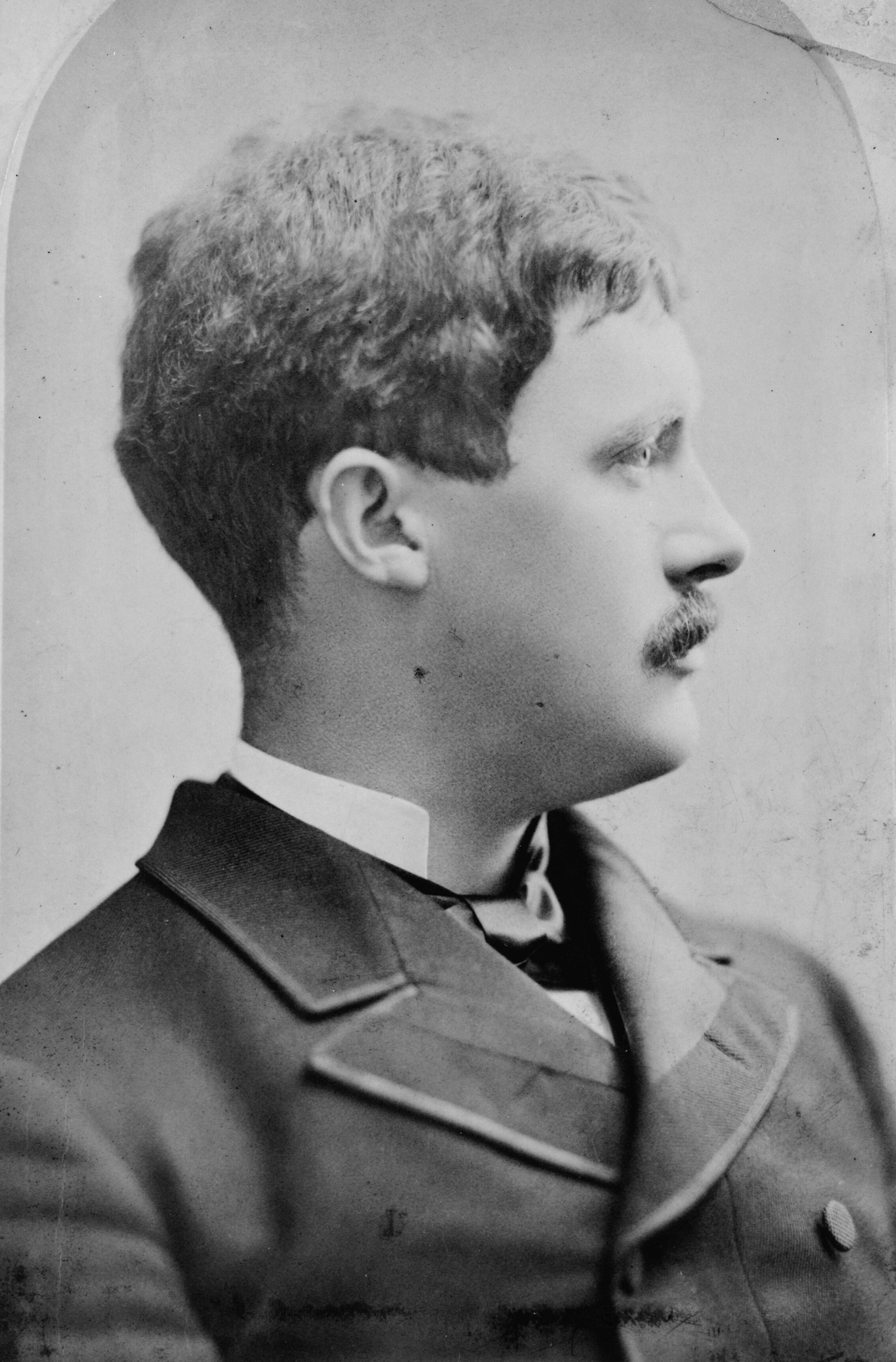
Grant in 1877

Grant served as personal secretary to his father for the last year of his administration, and later held the position of Assistant United States Attorney in New York.

Grant then worked in private practice and became wealthy. He entered into a partnership in a banking and brokerage firm with Ferdinand Ward. Grant and his father each invested $100,000 in the firm as two of the four partners, and sought investments from veterans and millionaires. However, neither Grant practiced due diligence in overseeing the operations of the firm, Grant & Ward.

The Grants were earning 2-3% per month on their money, but didn't care that Ward was using the Grant name to bring in new investors, whose money would pay the earlier investors. Other members of the extended Grant family, their associates, and many innocent people likewise invested. This unsustainable practice, akin to a Ponzi scheme, led to the firm's bankruptcy in 1884 – setting off a financial panic. Consequently, the Grants lost their initial investments, and President Grant was virtually wiped out. Ward was convicted of fraud and served over 6 years in prison of a 10 year sentence.

The elder Grant died the next year, but not before testifying against Ward. Historians generally consider that he was unaware of any irregularities in the firm's business. The extent of Grant Jr.'s culpability is less certain, and he was never brought to trial.

=== Real estate ===
When Ulysses Jr. was back on his feet financially, he bought Merryweather Farm in Salem Center, Westchester County, New York. His wife's health failing, Grant's mother suggested moving to California since his younger brother, Jesse Root Grant, was already living in San Diego. The Grants moved into a three-story house in San Diego in 1893.

Grant set up a law practice, then gave it up to invest in real estate. He purchased property throughout San Diego. In 1895, he bought the Horton House hotel. He wanted to run the hotel and name it after his father. In 1905, he razed the old hotel and built a new one, the U.S. Grant Hotel, in 1910. San Diego voters helped finance $700,000 for the $1.5 million needed to construct the hotel after Grant lacked the funds to do so. During his time in San Diego, Grant became a close associate of Charles T. Hinde, E. S. Babcock, and John D. Spreckels. Hinde and Grant served on the boards of directors of multiple banks and invested in many companies and business ventures together.

Grant continued to speculate in real estate. He also became a leading citizen, who pushed for the creation of a city park, that would become Balboa Park. Grant was a delegate-at-large for California at the Republican National Conventions in 1896 and 1900. He was also an elector for California in the 1904 and 1908 presidential elections (see U.S. Electoral College). In 1899, he was a candidate for U.S. Senate, but despite receiving the most votes on the first ballot could not reach a majority in the Legislature.

== Personal life ==
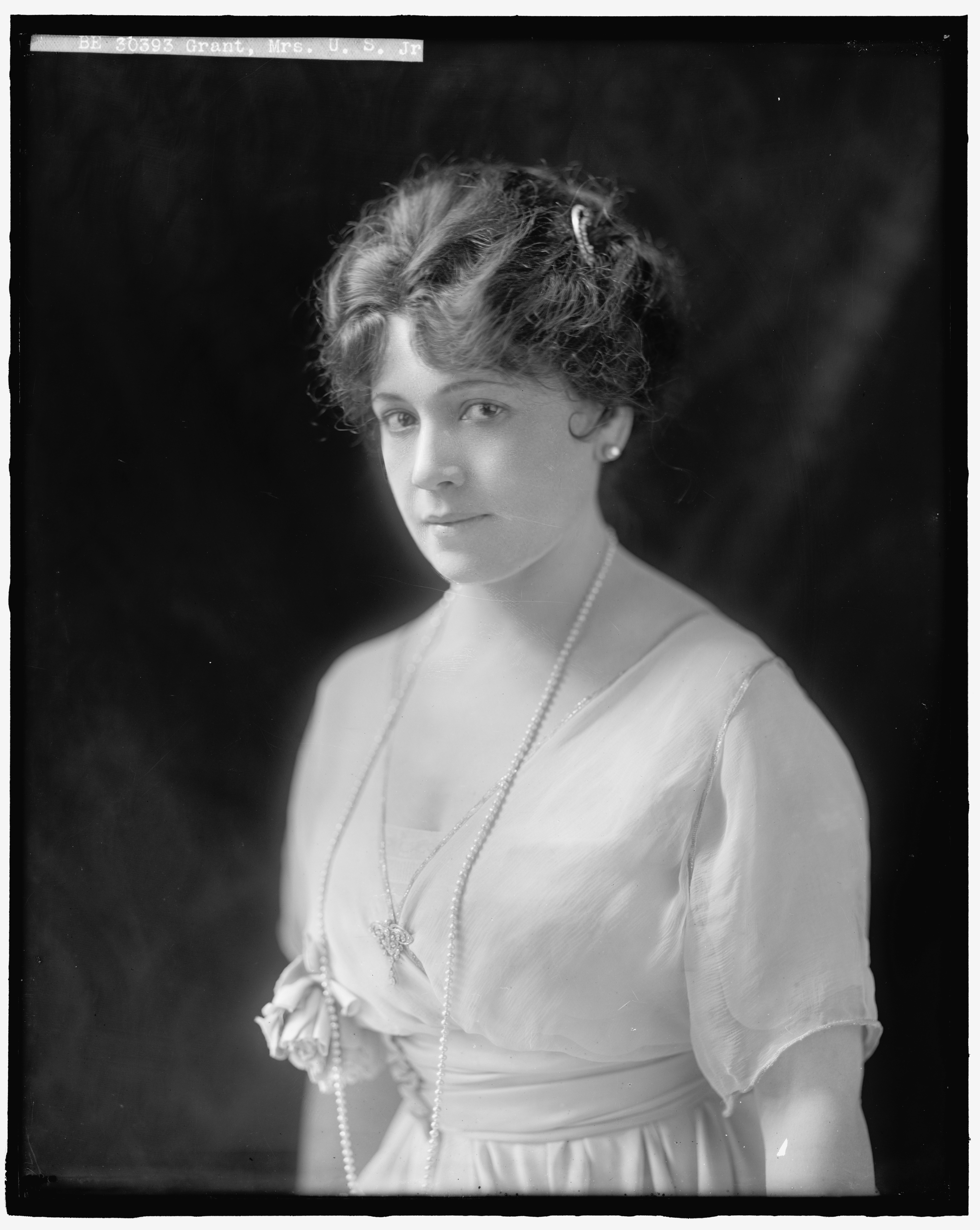
Grant's second wife, America

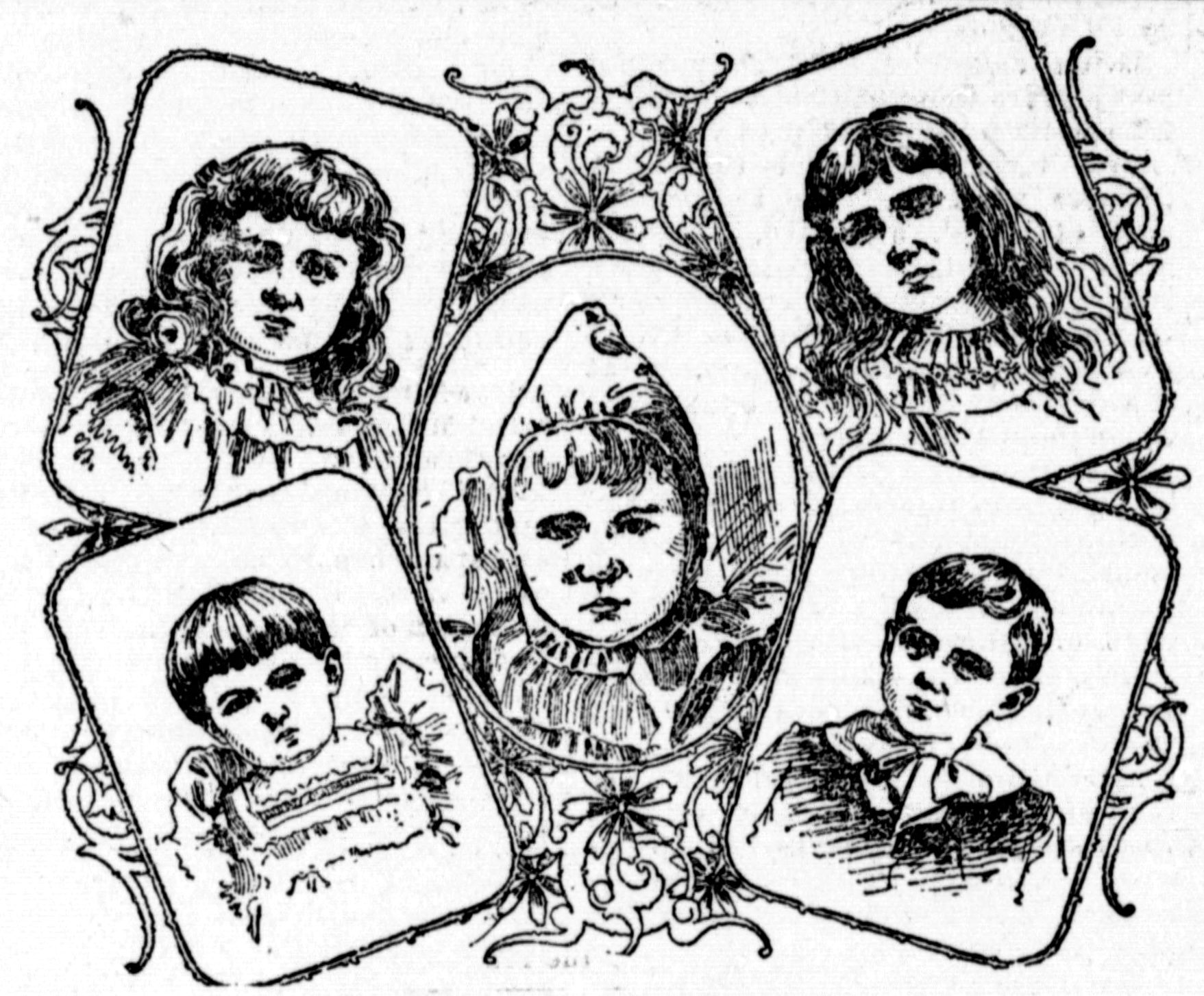
Grant's children

In 1880, Grant married Fannie Josephine Chaffee (1857–1909), daughter of Jerome B. Chaffee, a U.S. senator from Colorado. They had five children: Miriam (born 1881), Chaffee (born 1883), Julia (born 1885), Fannie (born 1889), and Ulysses IV (born 1893). Grant's wife died in 1909 and four years later he married a widow, America Workman Will (1878–1942). Grant and his wife traveled extensively. In his later years, they stayed closer to home and traveled in California.

Grant was a member of the Sons of Union Veterans of the Civil War.

Grant died on September 25, 1929 at age 77 at the Sandberg Lodge on the Ridge Route north of Los Angeles while on a road trip. He was buried at Greenwood Cemetery in San Diego.
