= Julia Grant =

First Lady of the United States from 1869 to 1877

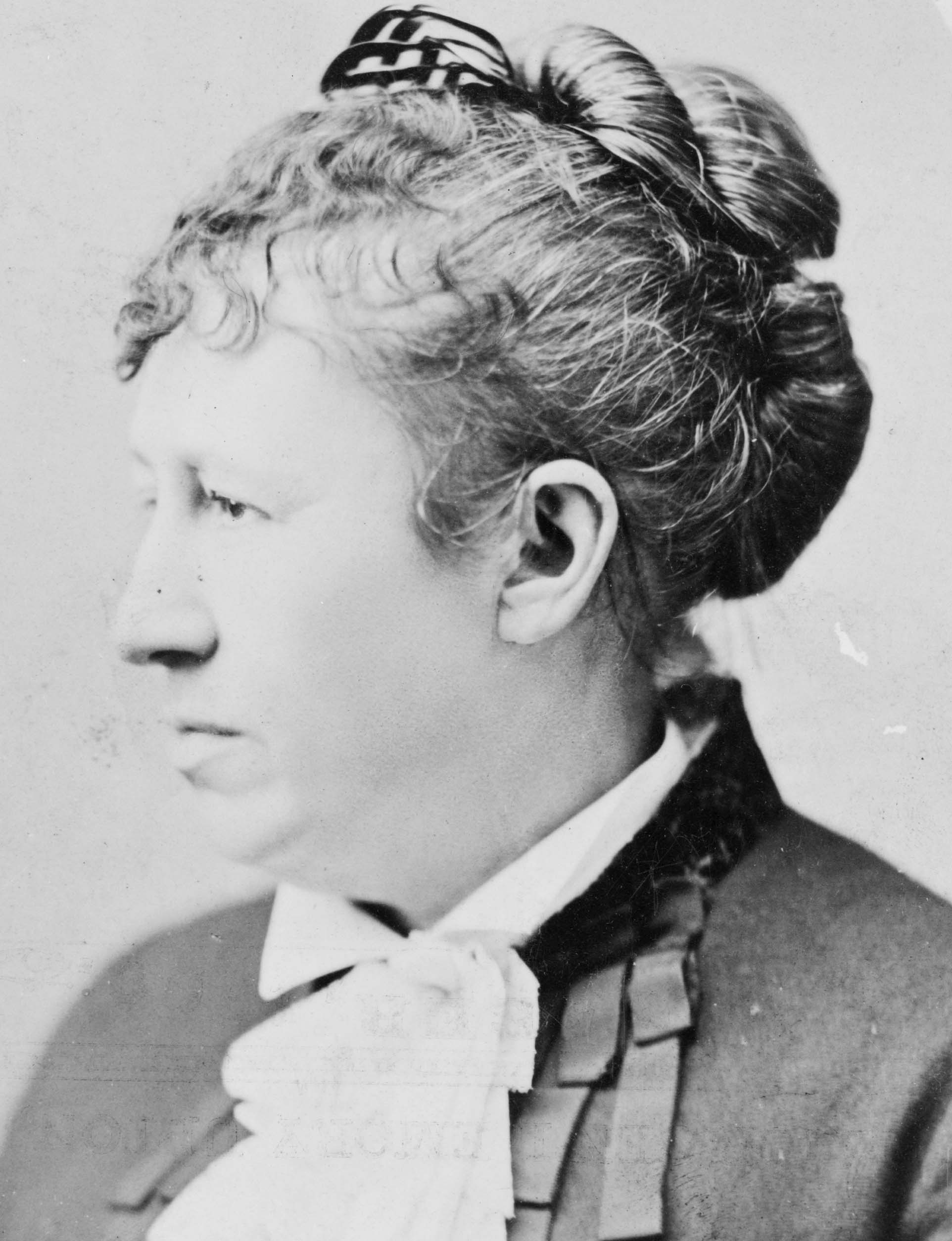

First Lady of the United States
- In role March 4, 1869 – March 4, 1877
- President: Ulysses S. Grant
- Preceded by: Eliza Johnson
- Succeeded by: Lucy Hayes

Personal details
- Born: Julia Boggs Dent; January 26, 1826 St. Louis, Missouri, U.S.
- Died: December 14, 1902 (aged 76) Washington, D.C., U.S.
- Resting place: General Grant National Memorial
- Spouse: Ulysses S. Grant (m. 1848; died 1885)
- Children: Frederick; Ulysses Jr.; Nellie; Jesse II

Julia Boggs Grant (née Dent; January 26, 1826 – December 14, 1902) was the First lady of the United States and wife of President Ulysses S. Grant.

As first lady, she became the first woman in the position to write a memoir. Her memoirs, The Personal Memoirs of Julia Dent Grant, were posthumously published in 1975.

== Early life and education ==
Julia Boggs Dent was born on January 26, 1826, at White Haven plantation west of St. Louis, Missouri. Her parents were Frederick Dent (1787–1873), a planter and merchant, and Ellen Wrenshall Dent. Frederick enslaved approximately 30 Africans, whom he freed only when compelled by law, having previously resisted moral arguments against slavery. Her family were of English descent, and her mother was born in England.

She grew up on her family's plantation, White Haven, where her father, Frederick Dent, provided a financially comfortable household. Dent's upbringing shielded her from hardship, she later recalled that life at White Haven, including family's enslaved laborers, were similar to her own. Grant was described as shy, sheltered, and largely removed from political life or the world beyond her family’s social circle. Descriptions portray her with limited exposure to household management or public life.

Grant, a distant maternal relative to Confederate general James Longstreet, was the fifth of eight children. In her memoirs, Grant described her childhood as "one long summer of sunshine, flowers, and smiles".

Around 1831–1836, Julia attended the Gravois School, a co-educational one-room schoolhouse in St. Louis. From age 10 to age 17, Grant attended the Mauro Academy for Young Ladies in St. Louis with the daughters of other affluent parents. Grant was a boarding student during the week and returned home to White Haven on weekends.

The Dent family was highly social, with visitors coming from among the elite class of Cincinnati, Louisville, and Pittsburgh. Explorer William Clark and politician Alexander McNair were family friends.

As a young woman, Grant was a skilled pianist and expert horsewoman; 'she enjoyed literature but disliked mathematics'.

== Strabismus ==
Grant was born with strabismus (more commonly known as "crossed eyes"), which prevents both eyes from lining up in the same direction. When she was younger, one of the best surgeons in the country offered to perform the simple operation that would fix them. Grant was not keen on surgery, however, and declined.

Grant was self-conscious about her eye condition. As her public role increased, she wanted to correct her eye with surgery, but physicians considered her too old to perform the operation. According to accounts, she found comfort from her husband who told her that he admires her eyes as they were.

Because her strabismus was never corrected, Grant almost always posed in profile for portraits.

== Engagement and marriage to Grant ==
While a student at West Point, New York, Fred Dent wrote to his sister Julia about how impressed he was with a fellow student, Ulysses S. Grant: "I want you to know him, he is pure gold." In 1844, Grant began visiting the Dent family. In April of that year, Ulysses asked Julia to wear his class ring as a sign of their exclusive affection. Eighteen-year-old Julia initially demurred. Ulysses' regiment was then ordered to Louisiana in preparation for service in the Mexican–American War. Distraught at their separation, Julia had an intense dream, which she detailed to several people, that Ulysses would somehow return within days, wearing civilian clothes and state his intention of staying for a week. Despite the unlikeliness of the dream, Ulysses did return just as Julia had predicted, and the two became engaged.

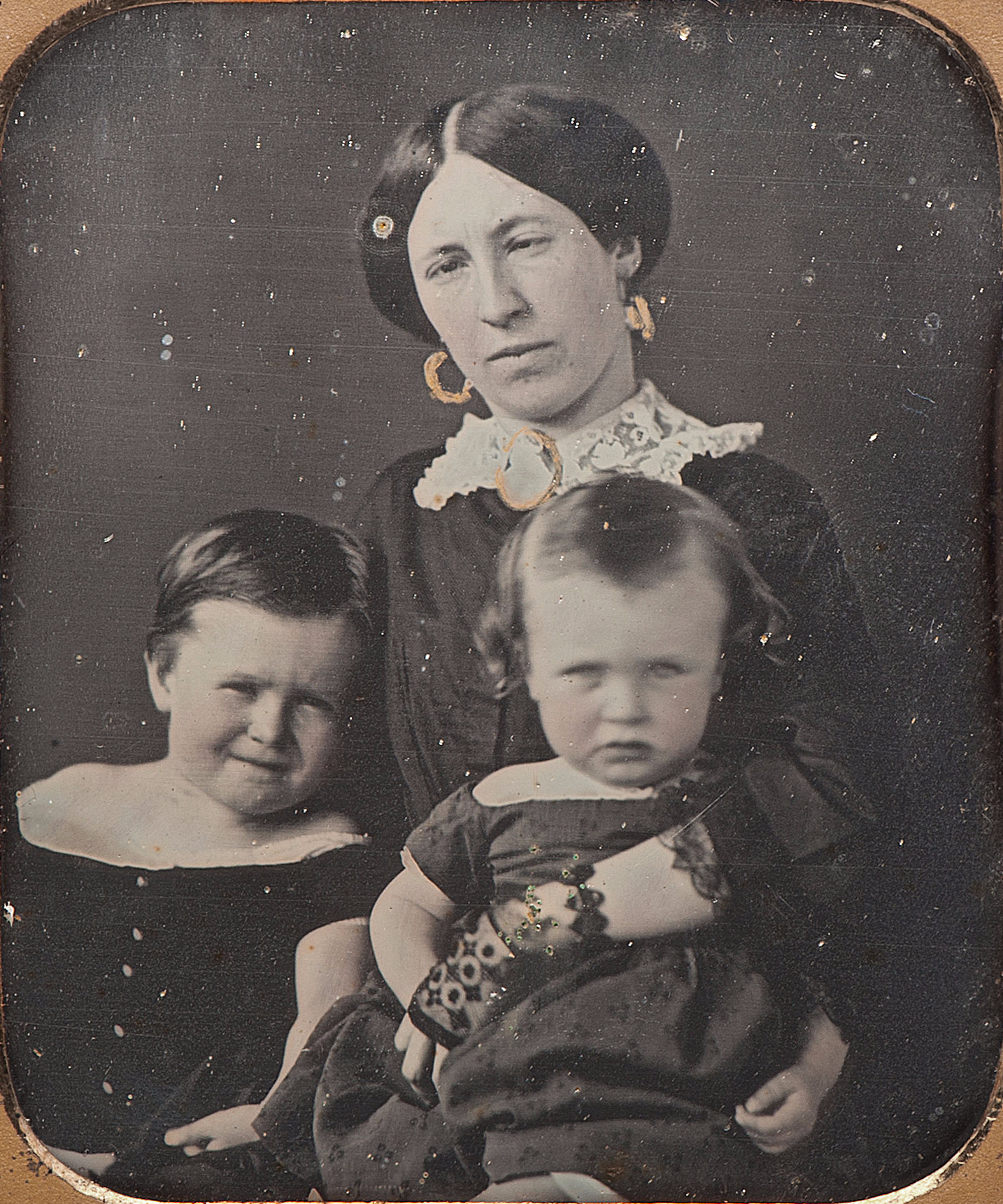
Portrait of Julia Dent Grant with her eldest children, Frederic Dent Grant and Ulysses S. Grant, Jr., 1854

Neither set of parents was enthusiastic about the match, with her parents doubting his future earnings capability and his parents disliking her father for being an enslaver. Nonetheless, the engagement held, and Ulysses often sent letters to her, including ones that described his first exposure to the horrors of battle. The couple would not get married until 1848, four years later, once Ulysses returned from the war. He then was posted to several far-away locations, including Panama and Vancouver Barracks, where she did not accompany him, although he continued to write her. He suffered from loneliness, boredom, and a possible drinking problem, and resigned from the Army in 1854.

Over the next few years, he tried several business ventures, none too successful, and her friends indicated that she had been unhappy for much of the first decade of their marriage. Meanwhile, she gave birth to four children between 1850 and 1858. In 1860, the family located themselves in Galena, Illinois, where Ulysses worked as a clerk in a store owned by his brother.

== Life during and after the Civil War ==
With the American Civil War underway, Ulysses rejoined the Army. During some parts of the war, Grant traveled to be near her husband, something unusual at the time. The rest of the time, the two sent letters to each other. While she was careful to preserve his letters to her—which have been published in several forms—none of her letters to him are known to survive, possibly because at some point she destroyed them.

Following their marriage, Grant adjusted to life as a military wife, often managing household responsibilities on her own while her husband was away on duty. Having grown up with slaves, she struggled with running a home. When the American Civil War broke out, her father remained a Democrat and supporter of the Confederacy, while Grant supported the Union, aligning herself to her husband's allegiance. At one point, during a stay with a Tennessee family, Grant was accused of Confederate sympathies because of her background and her home state of Missouri. She reportedly replied, “I am the most loyal of the loyal."

Throughout the war, she frequently visited Ulysses at his military camps, providing companionship and emotional support. She would travel regularly from camps, White Haven, and homes of relatives, leading to historians to remark that her "home" was wherever her husband was. Soldiers came to know her presence at camp, at times crediting for her attentiveness to her husband's well-being and often cared for him during periods of illness, including his recurring headaches. She served as mediator for Ulysses and the soldiers. Grant visited military hospitals while Ulysses was away from camp and would pass along messages and requests from the wounded soldiers to her husband.

President Abraham Lincoln invited the Grants to events. First Lady Mary Todd Lincoln extended a request to Grant for a public greeting together. Grant declined the request, reportedly due to her shyness. The refusal reportedly created tension between the two and future interactions were described as strained, with Mary showed hostility toward Grant.

She expressed strong personal belief in premonitions and often stated that she believed her husband was destined for greatness. Her premonitions became real as Ulysses S. Grant rose to the rank of General of the Army, led the Union to victory, and was later elected President of the United States.

Following the war's conclusion, Grant stated that she missed the energy and sense of purpose she experienced during the conflict. Her experience as a military wife contributed to her managing the family's finances after the war. She conducted her own research in order to purchase a home, which she refused to sell when Ulysses insisted. She cited legal protections for married women that property could not be sold without her consent.

The Grants were invited to attend Ford's Theatre but chose instead to travel to their new home. In her memoirs, Julia Grant wrote that she found the man who delivered the invitation as untrustworthy and tension between Mary Todd Lincoln and herself may have influenced her decision. Some historians have speculated these factors contributed to the couple's absence on the night of President Abraham Lincoln's assassination.

== Family and children ==
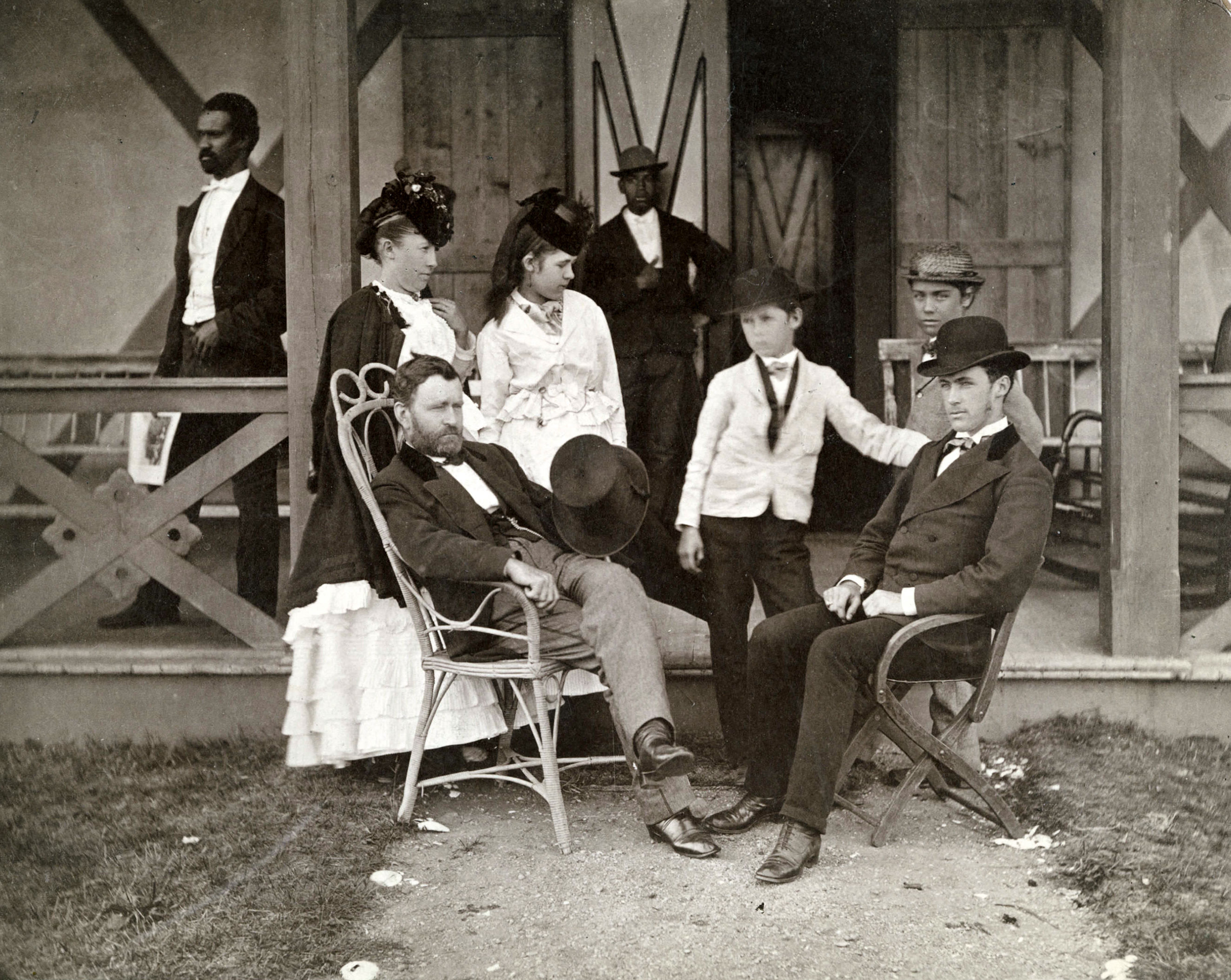
President Ulysses Grant and First Lady Julia Dent with their four children: Jesse, Ulysses Jr., Nellie, and Frederick in front of their cottage in Long Branch, New Jersey, 1870

The Grants had three sons and a daughter:

- Frederick Dent Grant (1850–1912) – soldier, public official
- Ulysses Simpson Grant Jr. known as "Buck" (1852–1929) – lawyer
- Ellen Wrenshall Grant known as "Nellie" (1855–1922) – homemaker
- Jesse Root Grant (1858–1934) – engineer

== First Lady of the United States (1869–1877) ==
Grant often referred to her time in the White House as the "happiest period" of her life. She hosted parties frequently, including gathering Union Army Officers and orchestrating elaborate and lavish dinners for politicians and guests. She was the originator of the State Dinner at the White House, which honored King Kalākaua of the Kingdom of Hawai'i. Initially, Grant insisted on the family continuing to reside in their own Washington home before eventually relenting to adhere to tradition.

She implemented changes to staff expectations, including dress codes and rules that did not allow eating or smoking while on duty. Her approach would be noted as influential on the management on government society and contributed for American domesticity. Grant is noted as the first presidential wife to receive national attention, resulting in her children becoming press favorites. After leaving the White House, she also became the first president's wife to write an autobiography for publication.

During her husband's first term in office, Grant redecorated the family living quarters into a Renaissance Revival style, with money appropriated from Congress for the renovations. During his second term in 1873, Congress appropriated $100,000 for additional renovations from 1873–1874. To prepare for First Daughter Nellie Grant's wedding, the Grants focused their refurbishing on the East Room, including the installation of gas globe chandeliers, which became renowned during the American Gilded Age among the elite. Herter Brothers, the New York furniture company, was the supplier of the furnishings in the East Room.

Grant sought to bring prestige to the position of First Lady and improve the stature of the wives of other government officials, including the cabinet, the Congress, and the Supreme Court. She was close friends with Julia Fish, wife of secretary of state Hamilton Fish. She did not publicly support women's suffrage, but refused to sign an anti-suffrage petition.

Grant was the first First Lady recorded on film.

== Later life ==
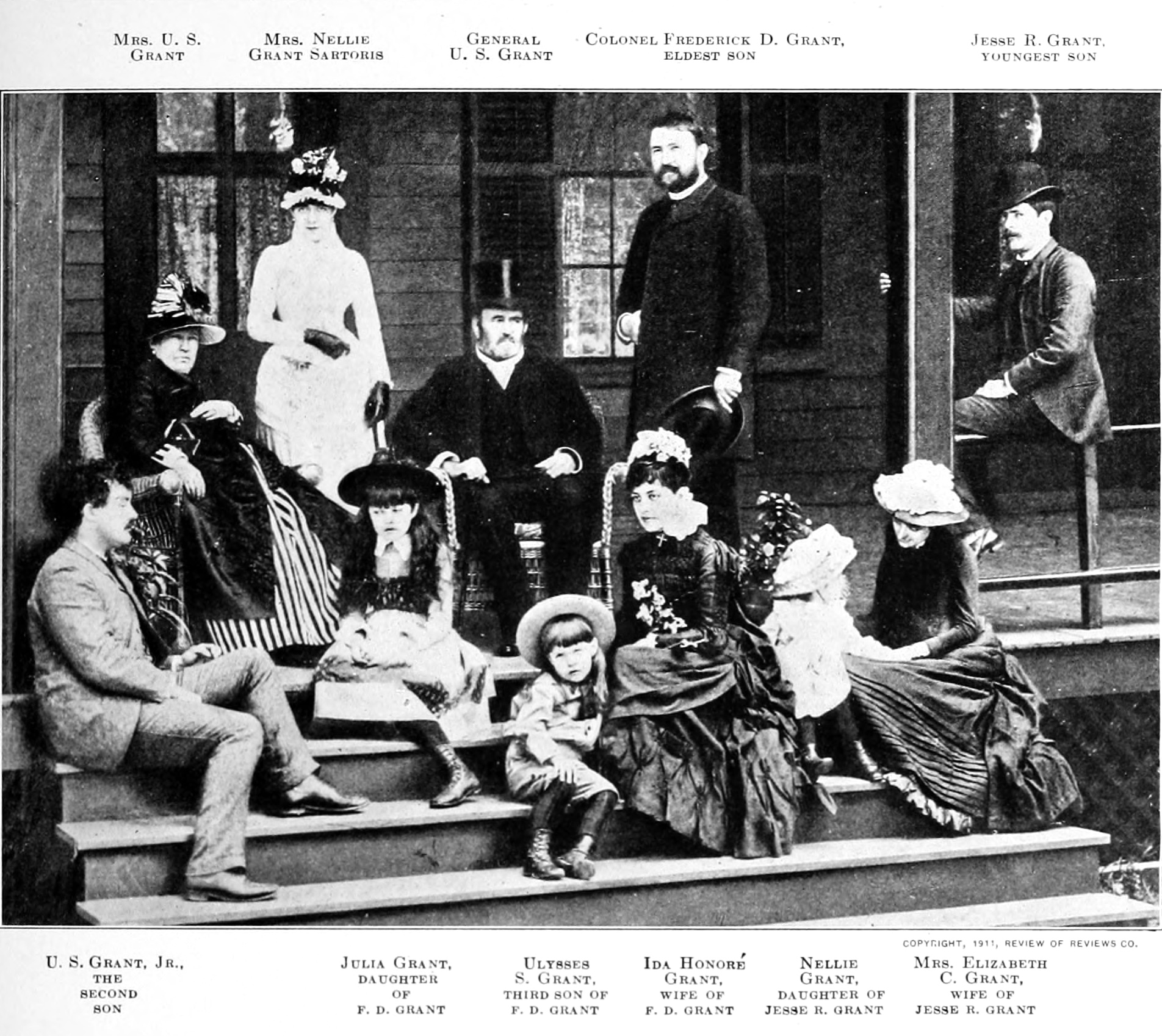
1885 picture of Ulysses S. Grant and Julia Dent with their children and grandchildren

Grant was the first First Lady to write a memoir. However, she was unable to find a publisher. The Personal Memoirs of Julia Dent Grant (Mrs. Ulysses S. Grant) was posthumously published in 1975.

She was a member of the Daughters of the American Revolution.

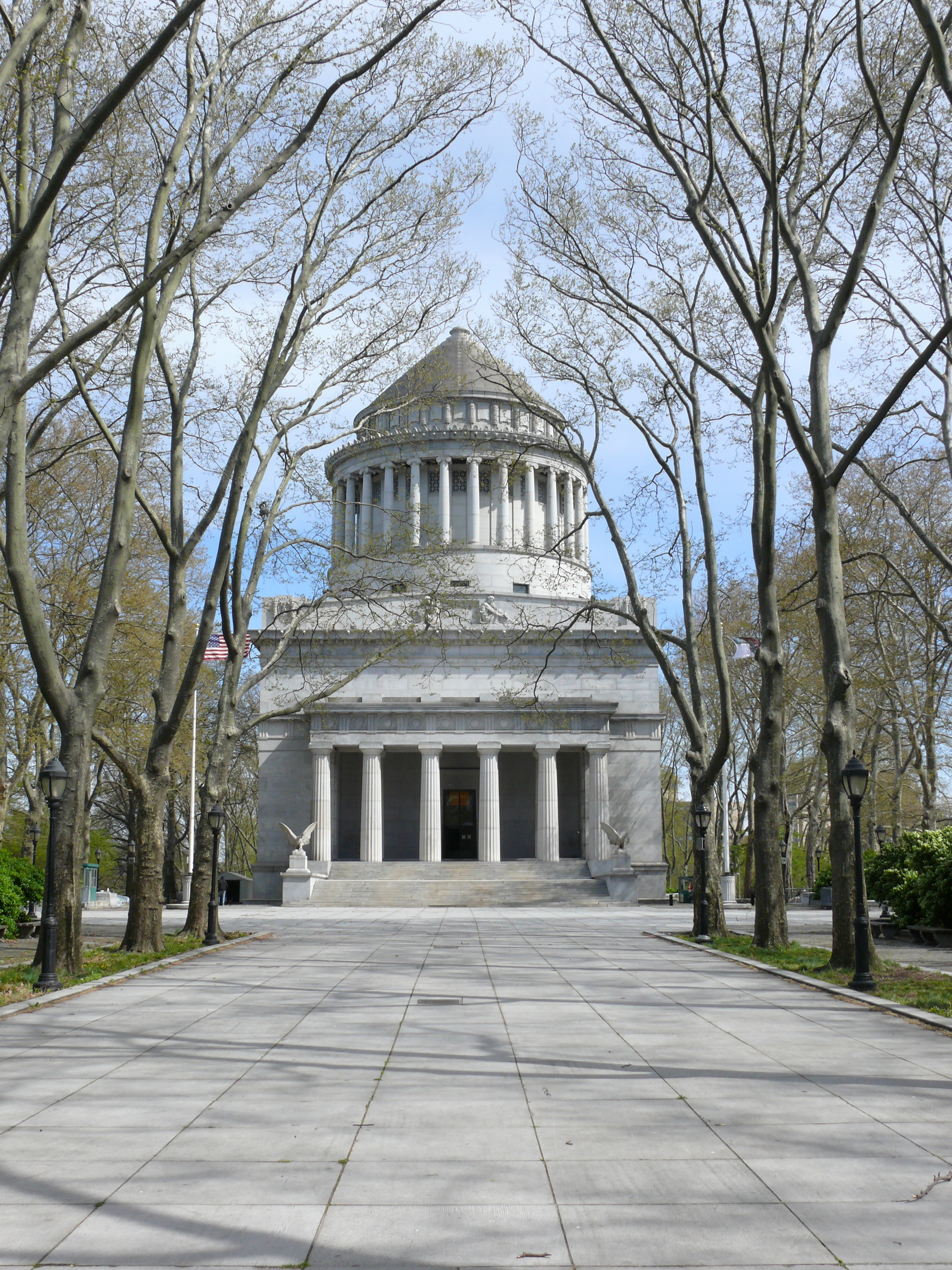
Grant's Tomb, a mausoleum containing the bodies of Ulysses and Julia Grant

While in Washington, D.C., Grant followed Dolley Madison's lead and acted as a "Queen Mother" figure. She became friends with First Ladies Frances Cleveland, Caroline Harrison, Ida Saxton McKinley and Edith Roosevelt. Following her husband's death in 1885 from throat cancer, Grant stated in her memoirs her life ended once her husband did, she lived seventeen years without him, wearing black for her remaining years. In 1897, she attended the dedication of Grant's monumental tomb overlooking the Hudson River in New York City.

=== Death ===
Julia Grant died from a heart and kidney disease on December 14, 1902, in Washington D.C. She was buried in a sarcophagus beside her husband. She had ended her own chronicle of their years together with a firm declaration: "the light of his glorious fame still reaches out to me, falls upon me, and warms me."

== See also ==
- Bibliography of United States presidential spouses and first ladies

Honorary titles
Preceded by Eliza Johnson	First Lady of the United States; 1869–1877	Succeeded by Lucy Hayes
