= Ulysses S. Grant IV =

Geologist and paleontologist (1893–1977)

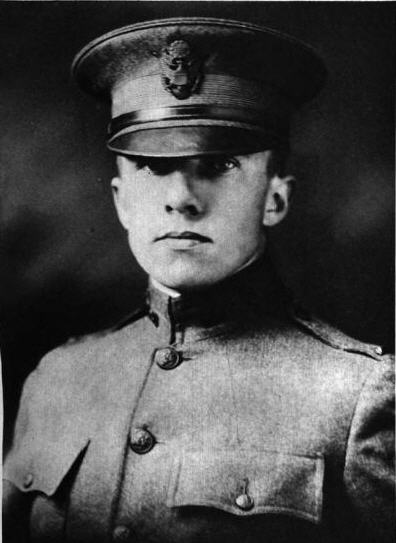
- Grant as a lieutenant in World War I
- Born: May 23, 1893; Salem Center, New York, U.S.
- Died: March 11, 1977 (aged 83); Santa Monica, California, U.S.
- Education: Harvard University, University of California, Berkeley, Stanford University (PhD 1929)
- Parents: Ulysses S. Grant Jr. (father); Fannie Josephine Mich (mother)
- Relatives: Ulysses S. Grant III (cousin), President Ulysses S. Grant, Senator Jerome B. Chaffee (grandfathers)
- Scientific career
- Fields: Geology and paleontology
- Workplaces: United States Army, Natural History Museum of Los Angeles County, University of California, Los Angeles

Ulysses Simpson Grant IV (May 23, 1893 – March 11, 1977) was an American geologist and paleontologist known for his work on the fossil mollusks of the California Pacific Coast. He was the youngest son of Ulysses S. Grant Jr., and a grandson of President Ulysses S. Grant and Senator Jerome B. Chaffee. He was born at his father's farm, Merryweather Farm, in Salem Center on May 23, 1893 Westchester County, New York. Shortly after his birth, the family moved to San Diego, California.

== Early life and education ==
Grant studied geology at Harvard University, graduating cum laude in 1915. Following graduation he mined for gold in Mexico. During World War I, Grant enlisted in the United States Army as a private. By the end of the war, he was a second lieutenant. From 1919 to 1925 he was connected with the New York Stock Exchange. In 1926, he returned to school and took graduate courses at the University of California, Berkeley. In 1927 he entered the graduate program in paleontology at Stanford University. Grant received his doctorate in 1929.

== Career ==
After he received his doctorate, Grant worked at the Natural History Museum of Los Angeles County as the curator of invertebrate paleontology. Grant then taught paleontology at the University of California, Los Angeles beginning in 1931. He rose from instructor to chairman of the geology department, a post he held for eight years. He retired in 1959. Grant wrote several papers and often collaborated with Leo George Hertlein, his classmate at Stanford.

== Later life and death ==
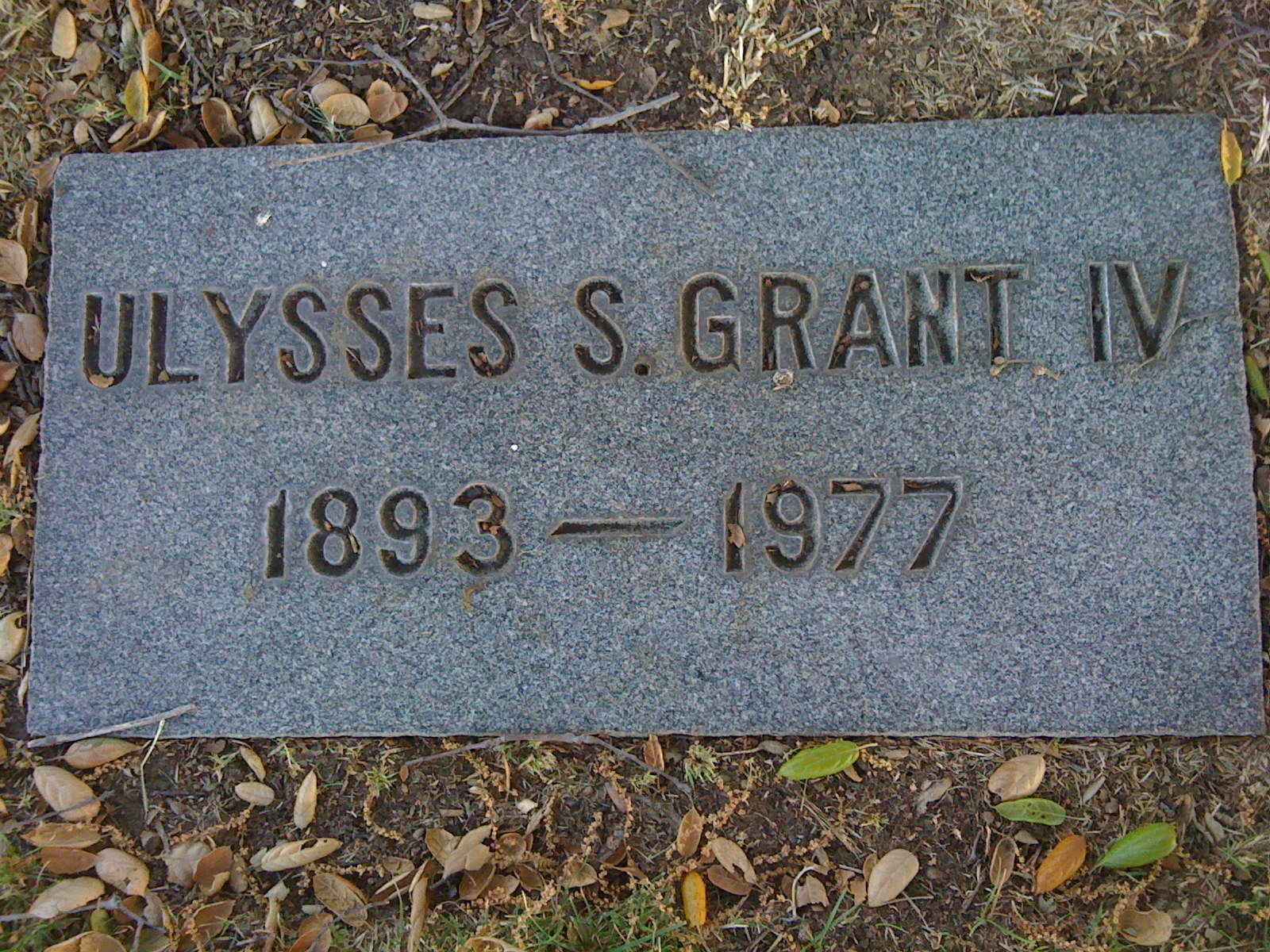
Grant's grave marker

In 1953, Grant IV appeared on Groucho Marx's You Bet Your Life, where the consolation question was usually "Who is buried in Grant's tomb?".

Grant died at St. John's Hospital in Santa Monica, California, from lung failure caused by leukemia. Grant is buried at Greenwood Memorial Park (San Diego) alongside his father.

== Personal life ==
Grant's first wife was Matilda Bartikofsky. They were married in Spartanburg, South Carolina, on October 4, 1917, and later divorced. In 1950, he married Frances Dean, who was born circa 1911 in Kentucky and died December 8, 1991, in Honolulu, Hawaii. They had no children.

Grant's cousin was Major General Ulysses S. Grant III, the son of Major General Frederick Dent Grant.

== Bibliography ==
- "Catalogue of the Marine Pliocene and Pleistocene Mollusca of California and Adjacent Regions and a Special Treatment of the Pectinidae and Turridae" with Hoyt Rodney Gale. Memoirs of the San Diego Society of Natural History, Volume I, 1931.
- "Geology and Oil Possibilities of Southwestern San Diego County" with Leo George Hertlein, California Journal of Mines and Geology, 1939.
- "The Cenozoic Brachiopoda of Western North America" with Leo George Hertlein. University of California, Publications in Mathematics and Physical Sciences, 1944.
- "The Geology and Paleontology of the Marine Pliocene of San Diego, California. Part 1, Geology" with Leo George Hertlein. Memoirs of the San Diego Society of Natural History, Volume II, 1944.
- "The Geology and Paleontology of the Marine Pliocene of San Diego, California. Part 2a, Paleontology" with Leo George Hertlein. Memoirs of the San Diego Society of Natural History, 1960.
- " The Geology and Paleontology of the Marine Pliocene of San Diego, California. Part 2b, Paleontology" with Leo George Hertlein. Memoirs of the San Diego Society of Natural History, 1972.
- "A Sojourn In Baja California, 1915" Southern California Quarterly Vol. XLV, No. 2, June 1963
- "1913 / A Midsummer Motoring Trip". Desert Magazine. 25 (3): 20. March 1962.
- Grant, U. S. (March 1961). "A Midsummer Motoring Trip". The Historical Society of Southern California Quarterly. 43 (1): 85–96. doi:10.2307/41169503. JSTOR 41169503.
