= Ulysses S. Grant III =

American army officer and grandson of President Ulysses S. Grant (1881–1968)

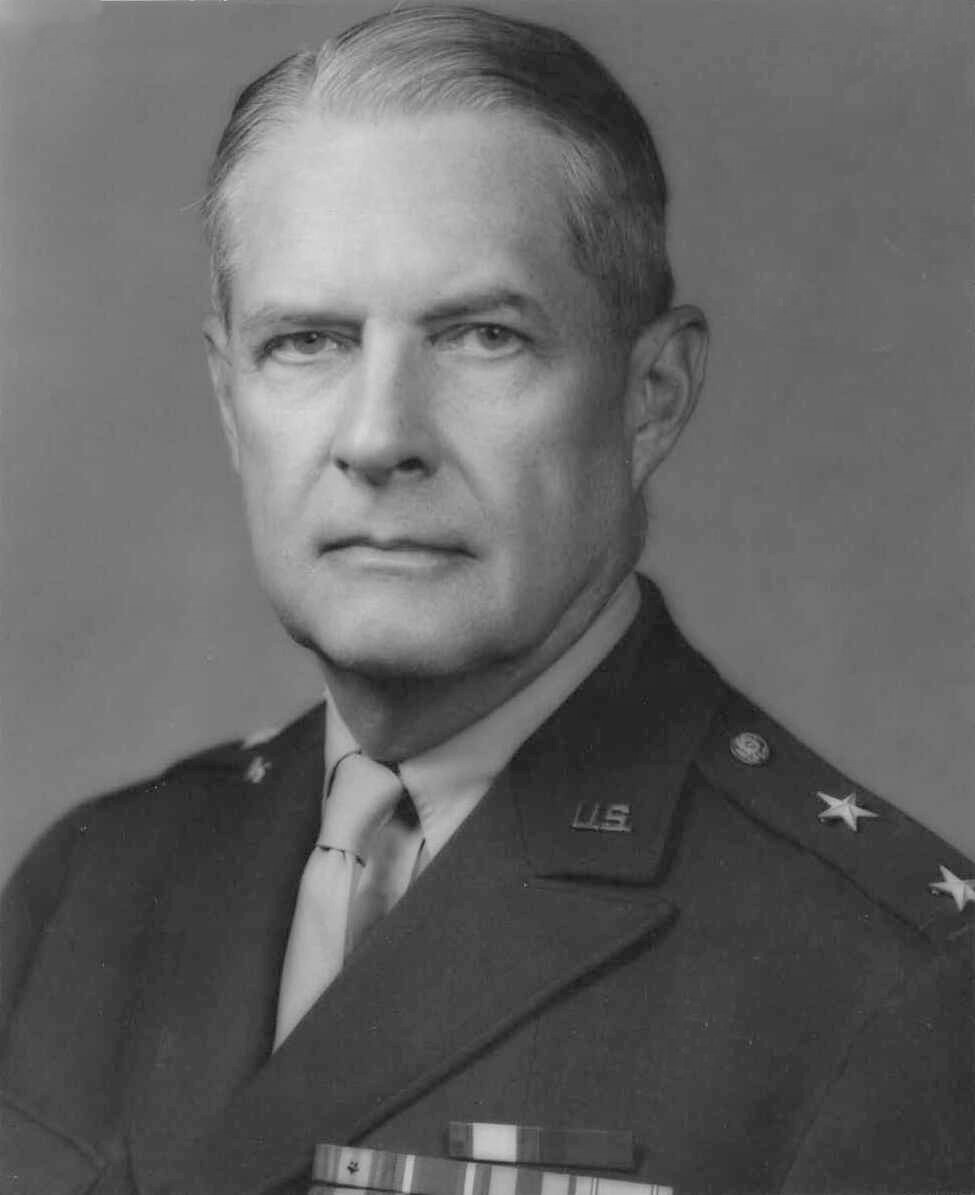
- Born: Ulysses Simpson Grant III; July 4, 1881; Chicago, Illinois, U.S.
- Died: August 29, 1968 (aged 87); Clinton, New York, U.S.
- Spouse: Edith Root (m. 1907; died 1962)
- Children: 3
- Relatives: Ulysses S. Grant (grandfather); Frederick Dent Grant (father); Ulysses S. Grant IV (cousin)
- Military career
- Allegiance: United States
- Branch: United States Army
- Service years: 1903–1946
- Rank: Major General
- Service number: 0-1790
- Unit: Corps of Engineers
- Commands: 1st Engineer Regiment; Engineer Replacement Training Center; Office of Civilian Defense
- Conflicts: Philippine–American War; World War I World War II
- Awards: Distinguished Service Medal; Legion of Merit; Légion d'honneur Croix de Guerre
- Other work: Vice president of George Washington University

Ulysses Simpson Grant III (July 4, 1881 – August 29, 1968) was a United States Army officer and planner. He was the son of Frederick Dent Grant, and the grandson of General of the Armies and American President Ulysses S. Grant.

== Early life and education ==
Grant was born in Chicago, as a grandson of President and General Ulysses S. Grant and educated in Austria, where his father was an American diplomat. He attended Columbia University until 1898 when he received an appointment to West Point. In July and August 1899, both Grant and Douglas MacArthur joined their first summer camp at West Point, and they were especially marked plebes for hazing by upperclassmen since they were the grandson and son, respectively, of well-known men (Ulysses S. Grant and Arthur MacArthur). Grant graduated sixth in his class in 1903 while MacArthur graduated first in that class.

== Military career ==
After his graduation from West Point, Grant was assigned to the Corps of Engineers of the United States Army and graduated from the U.S. Engineer School in 1908. He also served in the General Staff Corps from 1917 to 1920 and again from 1936 to 1940.

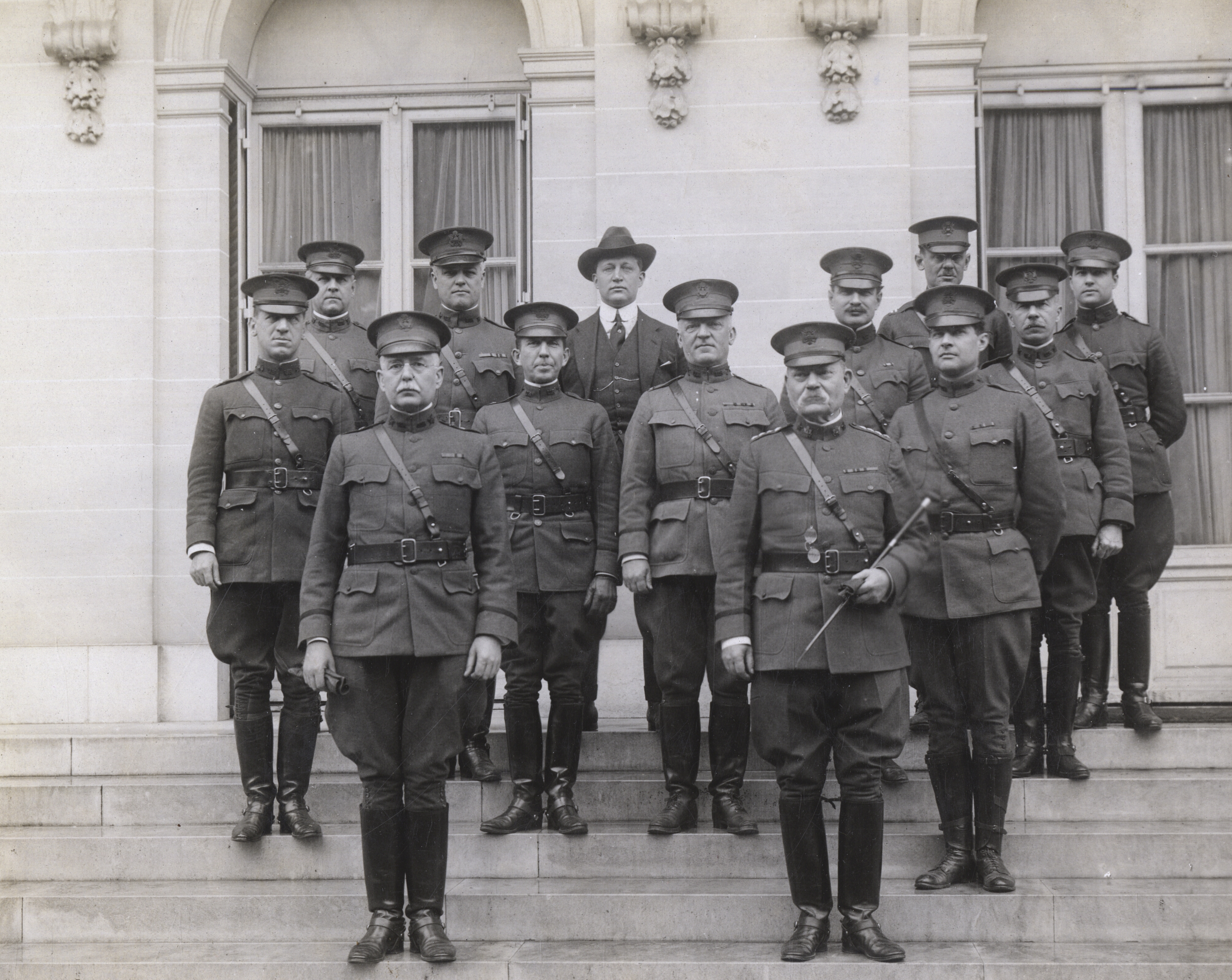
The Allied War Council at the home of General Tasker H. Bliss at Versailles, France, May 1918. Colonel U. S. Grant III is stood in the second row, fourth from the left.

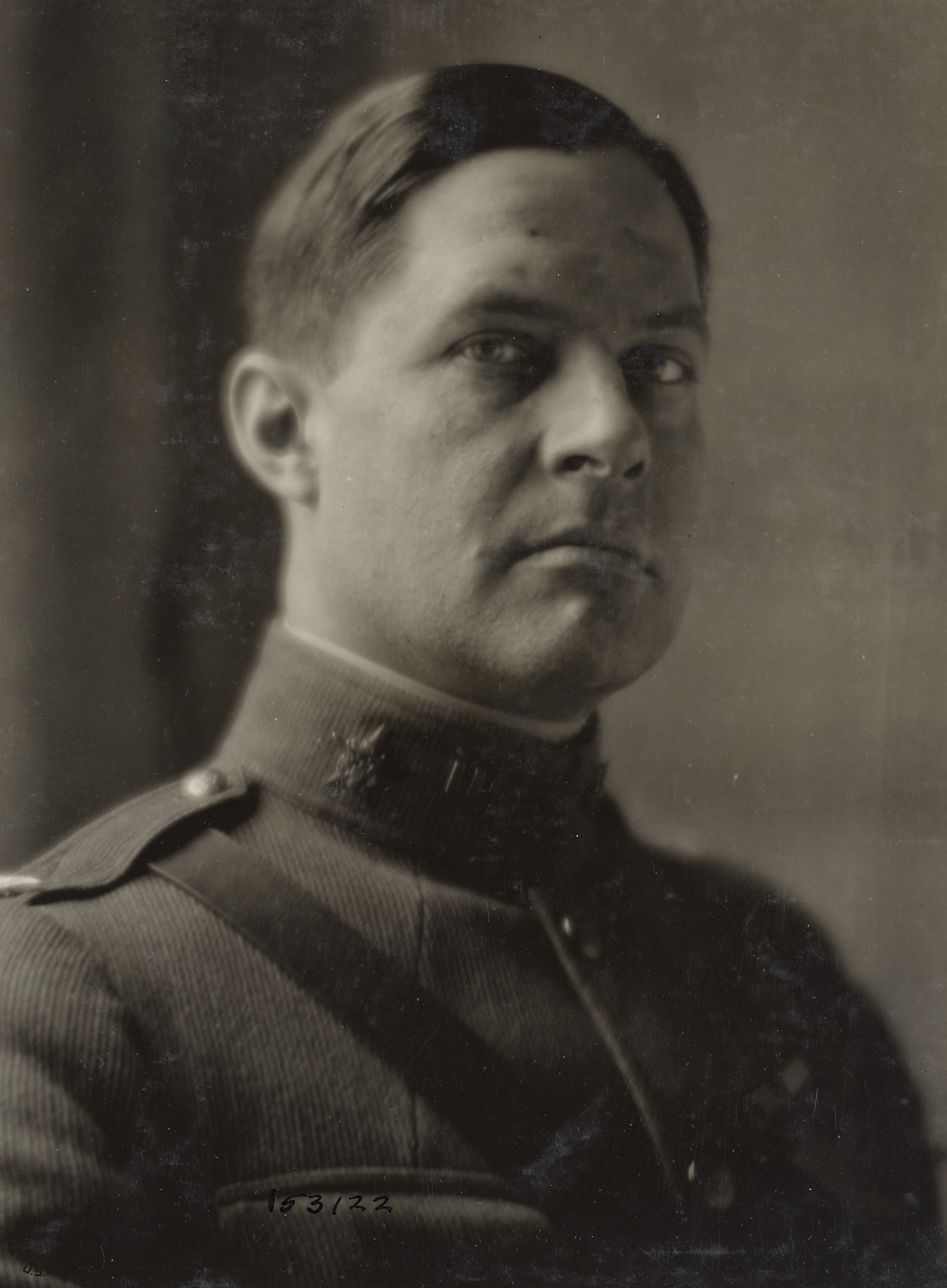
Grant as a member of General Tasker H. Bliss's staff c. 1919

Grant served on Mindanao in the Philippines (1903–04); the Cuban Pacification (1906); the Mexican Border Service (1913–1917), including the Veracruz Expedition (1914), and the Pancho Villa Expedition (1916); as well as in World War I and World War II.

In 1904 Grant served as an aide to U.S. President Theodore Roosevelt. Grant met his future wife while he was at the White House.

In 1907, Grant married Edith Ruth Root, the daughter of Elihu Root, the former Secretary of War and Secretary of State. They had three daughters.

During World War I, Grant was promoted to major. From 1918 to 1919, Major Grant served on the staff of General Tasker H. Bliss, the United States representative at the Supreme War Council at Versailles. Grant was the secretary of the American section. In 1918, he assisted in the treaty negotiations with Germany regarding the treatment of prisoners of war. In 1919, Grant served on President Woodrow Wilson's commission to negotiate peace in Paris.

For his service during the war Grant was awarded the Army Distinguished Service Medal, the citation for which reads:

The President of the United States of America, authorized by Act of Congress, July 9, 1918, takes pleasure in presenting the Army Distinguished Service Medal to Colonel (Corps of Engineers) Ulysses S. Grant, III, United States Army, for exceptionally meritorious and distinguished services to the Government of the United States, in a duty of great responsibility during World War I. As Secretary of the American section, Supreme War Council, Colonel Grant was entrusted with the most important duty of coordinating the work of the Joint Secretariat of the Supreme War Council and of the Joint Secretariat of the Military Representatives of the Supreme War Council, and as a member of the War Prisoners' commission, Berne, Switzerland, he has rendered conspicuous service to the Government.

=== Post-World War I ===
After the war, Grant returned to the United States and was the district engineer of the 2nd Engineer District in San Francisco. While in California, Grant also served on the California Debris Commission. On August 28, 1923, Grant made his first visit to the Sierra Nevada. The superintendent of General Grant National Park (now Kings Canyon National Park) invited Grant to see the park named after Grant's grandfather. Grant visited the General Grant Grove and the General Grant tree, a Giant Sequoia.

By 1923, Grant went to Washington, D.C., and was the executive officer of the Arlington Memorial Bridge Commission and a member of the National Capital Park and Planning Commission. In 1925, he was director of the newly created Office of Public Buildings and Public Parks of the National Capital (1925–1933). By 1927 he was promoted to lieutenant colonel, and was appointed as a co-director of the bicentennial celebration of the birth of George Washington. As the director of the parks in Washington, Grant also supervised the United States Park Police. Grant expanded the police, instituted plain-clothes patrols, and modernized the force with the addition of motorcycles and automobiles. Later, in 1928, Grant ordered the police to crack down on late-night "petters" in the parks.

In 1934, he graduated from the Army War College. He commanded the 1st Engineer Regiment at Fort DuPont, Delaware and the Delaware Civilian Conservation Corps District from 1934 to 1936. He was a full colonel by this time.

In 1936, Grant was the chief of staff of the Second Corps Area at Fort Jay, Governors Island, New York, an army post where his grandfather had stayed prior to his posting to California in 1854 and where his father commanded a department and was division commander until his death in 1912. While in New York, Grant, his wife, and her siblings and their spouses were present at the bedside of his father-in-law, Elihu Root, when he died in 1937.

In 1940, Grant was division engineer for the Great Lakes Engineer Division, headquartered in Cleveland, Ohio. He was promoted to brigadier general.

=== World War II ===
From 1941 to mid 1942, he commanded the Engineer Replacement Training Center at Fort Leonard Wood, Missouri. In July 1942, Grant was made chief of the Protection Branch of the Office of Civilian Defense in Washington, D.C.; he was in charge of the United States' civil defense and often traveled across the country in this capacity.

In 1943, Grant was promoted to major general. In July 1945 he reached the mandatory retirement age of 64 and retired on 31st of the month. The next day he was recalled to active duty and served until he became fully retired from the Army on July 15, 1946.

== Post military career ==
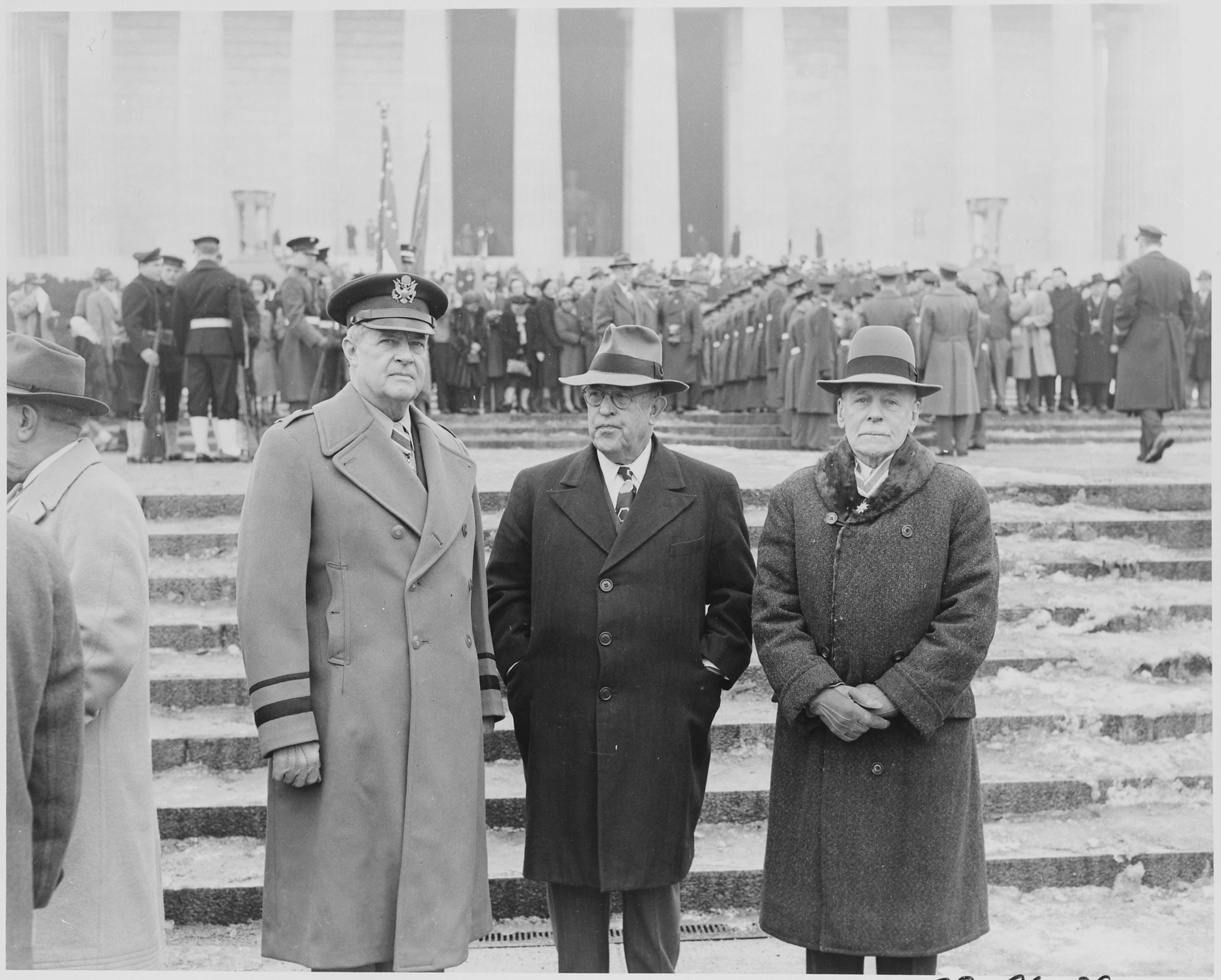
Grant (left) at the Lincoln Memorial in 1949

After his retirement from the army, Grant again served on the National Capital Park and Planning Commission. He was vice president of George Washington University from 1946 to 1951. In addition, he also served as president of the American Planning and Civic Association from 1947 to 1949. He was also on the National Council of Historic Sites and a trustee of the National Trust for Historic Preservation.

Grant's testimony as a Corps of Engineers veteran before Congress in opposition to the Echo Park Dam in Dinosaur National Monument was a key element in the cancellation of the project, and in protection of national park lands against water development projects.

From 1952 to 1968, Grant served as president of the board of trustees of the Columbia Historical Society (now the Historical Society of Washington, D.C.). From 1957 to 1961, he was chairman of the Civil War Centennial Commission. He resigned from the Centennial Commission due to the illness of his wife and because of controversies that developed in planning commemorative events for the centennial of the American Civil War.

In 1967 Grant was awarded the Gold Good Citizenship Medal from the Sons of the American Revolution.

== Memberships ==
Grant belonged to the Military Order of the Loyal Legion of the United States (MOLLUS), the Sons of Union Veterans of the Civil War (SUVCW) and the Aztec Club of 1847. He served as the Aztec Club's president for three non-consecutive terms from 1951 to 1952, 1953 to 1954 and 1955 to 1956. He served as commander-in-chief of MOLLUS from 1957 to 1961. He also served as commander-in-chief of the SUVCW from 1953 to 1955 and as national counselor of the SUVCW from 1961 until his death in 1968. He is the only person to have served as the national president of all three organizations.

In 1912 he was elected to membership in the Empire State Society of the Sons of the American Revolution and was assigned SAR national membership number 24,174. He was also an hereditary member of the Military Order of the Carabao in succession to his father who died in 1912. He was also a member of the Order of the Founders and Patriots of America and served as the Order's twenty-first Governor General from 1933 to 1935 and again as its thirty-second Governor General from 1954 to 1957.

In addition to the above organizations, Grant was also eligible for membership in the United Spanish War Veterans, Military Order of Foreign Wars, Military Order of the World Wars, Veterans of Foreign Wars and the American Legion.

== Later life and death ==
After the death of his wife, General Grant remained at his home on the outskirts of Clinton, New York near Hamilton College.

In 1961, Grant received an honorary LL.D. degree from Hamilton College.

Grant died August 29, 1968, in Clinton, New York. He was buried in Hamilton College Cemetery in the same town.

His cousin was Ulysses S. Grant IV, who was the son of Ulysses S. Grant, Jr.

== Awards and decorations ==
- Distinguished Service Medal
- Legion of Merit
- Philippine Campaign Medal
- Army of Cuban Pacification Medal
- Mexican Service Medal
- World War I Victory Medal
- American Defense Service Medal
- American Campaign Medal
- World War II Victory Medal
- Companion of the Order of St Michael and St George (UK)
- Officier Légion d'honneur (France)
- Croix de Guerre (France)
- Order of Saints Maurice and Lazarus (Italy)

== Dates of rank ==
No insignia	Cadet, United States Military Academy: June 13, 1899
No insignia in 1903	Second lieutenant, Regular Army: June 11, 1903
	First lieutenant, Regular Army: June 11, 1904
	Captain, Regular Army: February 27, 1911
	Major, Regular Army: June 3, 1916
	Lieutenant colonel, temporary: August 5, 1917
	Colonel, National Army: December 20, 1917
	Major, Regular Army: March 15, 1920 (Reverted to permanent rank.)
	Lieutenant colonel, Regular Army: October 13, 1926
	Colonel, Regular Army: October 1, 1934
	Brigadier general, Army of the United States: October 25, 1940
	Major general, Army of the United States: February 2, 1943
	Major general, Retired List: July 31, 1945
	Recalled to active service as major general: August 1, 1945
	Released from active duty: July 15, 1946

Source: U.S. Army Register, 1946.

== Bibliography ==
- "Washington, a Treasure of Opportunities." American Magazine of Art Vol. 22, May 1931.
- "Washington, a Planned City in Evolution." Journal of the American Institute of Architects Vol. 1, March 1944.
- "Major Problems in Planning a Worthy Capital for the Nation." Landscape Architecture Vol. 40, October 1949.
- "Here Comes the Greatest Centennial in U.S. History!" published in various newspapers October 1960.
- Ulysses S. Grant: Warrior and Statesman. (1969) William Morrow & Company, New York. This is a biography of his famous grandfather and was published posthumously.
