= Algernon Edward Sartoris =

Grandson of Ulysses S. Grant (1877–1928)

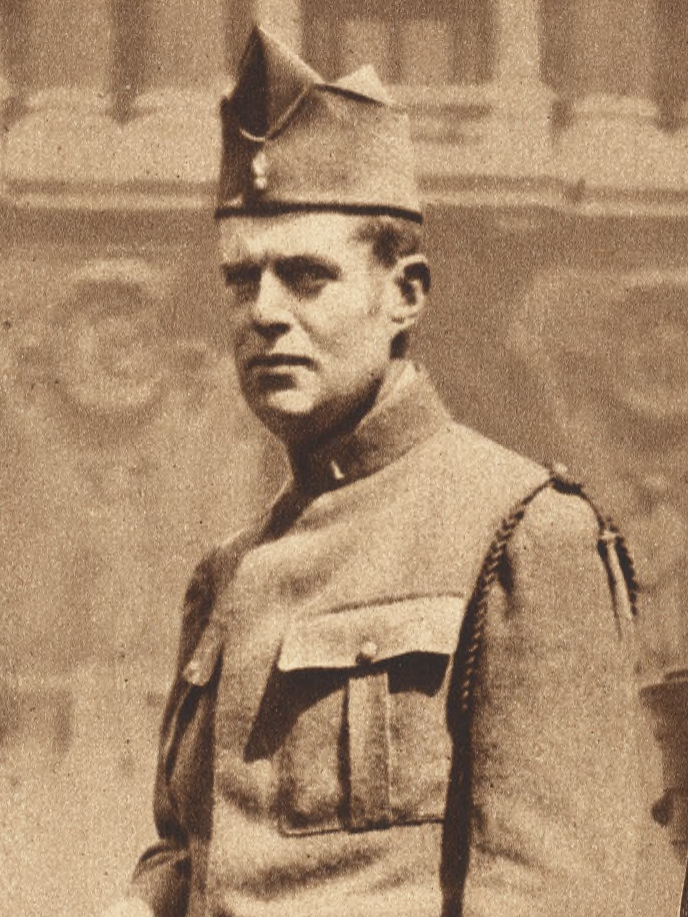
- Captain Algernon Sartoris in World War I
- Born: Algernon Edward Urban Sartoris; March 17, 1877; Washington, DC, US
- Died: January 17, 1928 (aged 50); Paris, France
- Occupation: Diplomat
- Spouse: Cécile Noufflard (m. 1904)
- Parent(s): Algernon Charles Frederick Sartoris; Nellie Grant

Algernon Edward Urban Sartoris (March 17, 1877 – January 17, 1928) was an American diplomat. His maternal grandfather was Ulysses S. Grant. Sartoris was born on March 17, 1877, to Nellie Grant and Algernon Charles Frederick Sartoris in Washington, DC. He resigned from the military in 1903. Sartoris married Cécile Noufflard on April 20, 1904, in Paris, France. In 1922, Sartoris inherited a highly prized enamel medallion containing a lock of hair from his grandfather. He died in 1928 in Paris, France.
