= Nellie Grant =

Daughter of President U.S. Grant (1855–1922)

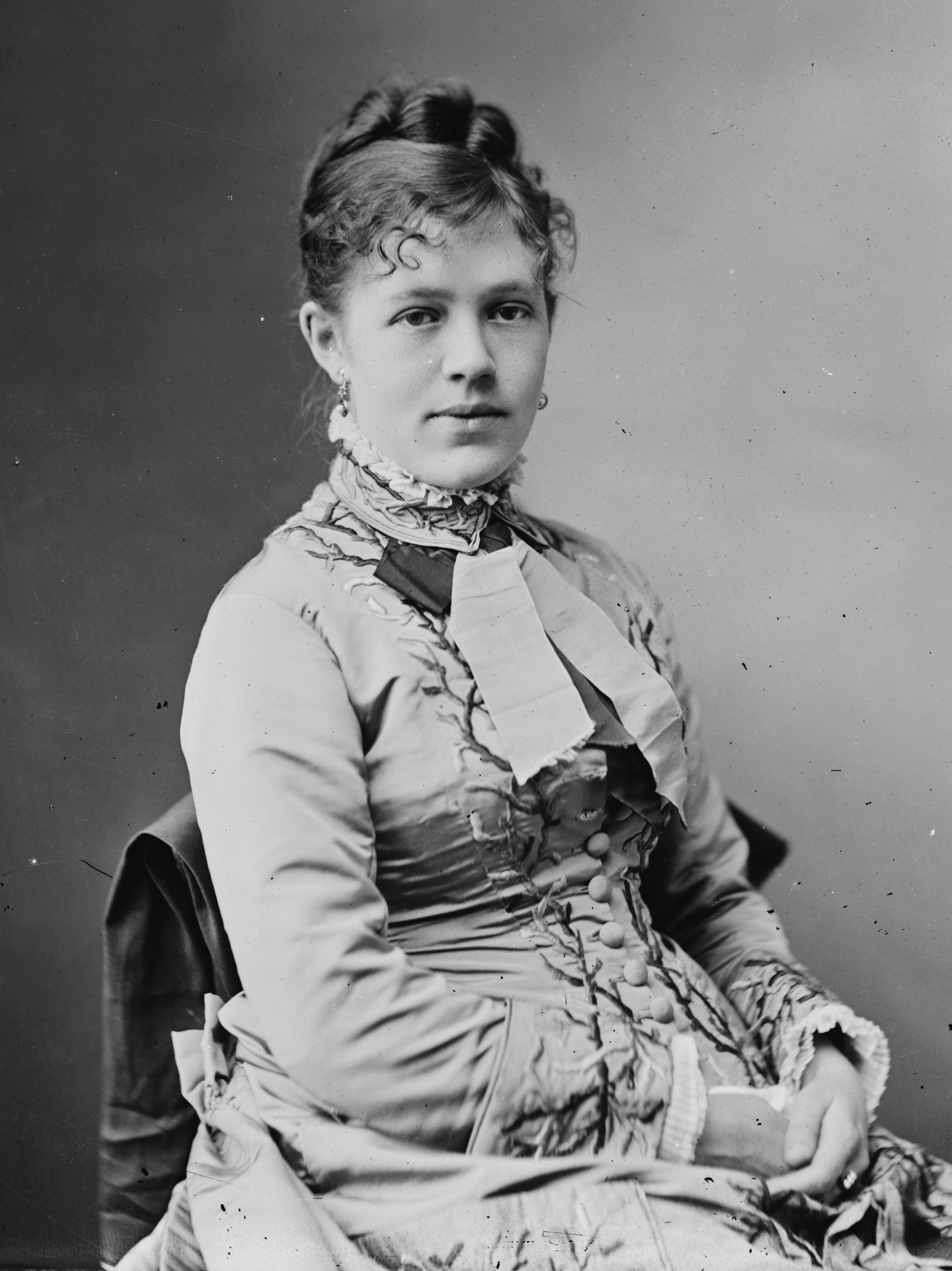
- Born: Ellen Wrenshall Grant; July 4, 1855; St. Louis, Missouri, U.S.
- Died: August 30, 1922 (aged 67); Springfield, Illinois, U.S.
- Burial place: Oak Ridge Cemetery
- Occupations: Housewife, mother
- Known for: Daughter of President Grant
- Spouses: Algernon Sartoris (m. 1874; div. 1889) Frank Hatch Jones (m. 1912)
- Children: 4, including Algernon Edward Sartoris
- Parent(s): Ulysses S. Grant; Julia Dent

Ellen Wrenshall Grant (July 4, 1855 – August 30, 1922) was the third child and only daughter of U.S. President Ulysses S. Grant and First Lady Julia Grant. At the age of 16, Nellie was sent abroad to England by President Grant, and was received by Queen Victoria. As a teenager growing up in the White House, she attracted much attention.

In 1874, Nellie was one of a few women who married at the White House. Her marriage to Englishman Algernon Sartoris produced children, but the couple later became estranged, and she was granted a divorce. She remarried to Frank Jones, but within a few months she became ill. She died in 1922.

== Early life ==
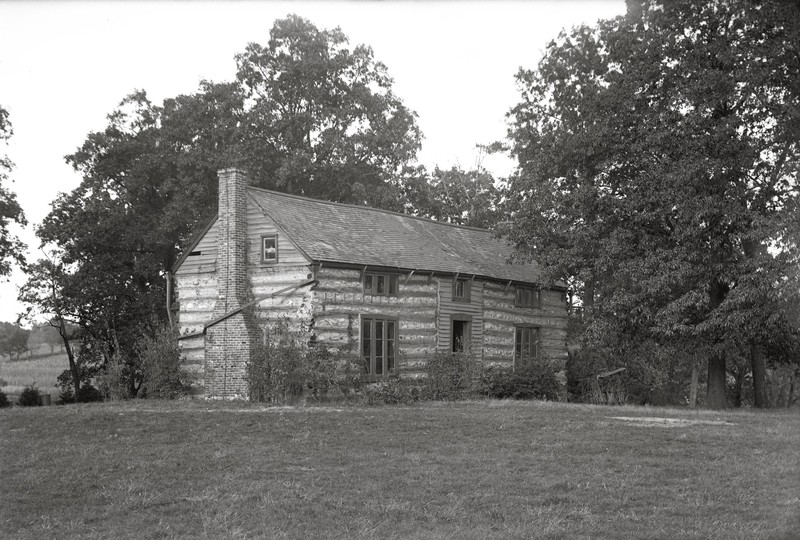
Nellie Grant lived in a log cabin, built by her father Ulysses S. Grant the first two years of her life.

Nellie Grant was born on July 4, 1855, in Wistonwisch, Missouri, near St. Louis, on the estate slave plantation of Col. Frederick Dent, known as White Haven. Her father was Mexican–American War veteran Ulysses S. Grant and her mother was Julia Dent Grant, the daughter of Col. Dent. She was first named Julia, at the insistence of her father, but was christened Ellen Wrenshall at 18 months to honor her dying grandmother. For the first two years Nellie was raised in a log cabin, called Hardscrabble, that was built by her father.

== White House years ==
At the age of 13, Nellie moved into the White House, after her father was elected to the Presidency in 1868. Grant was a successful Union War general and Commanding General of the U.S. Army during the Reconstruction Era. Nellie shared the national popularity of her father President Grant. The nation was fascinated by Nellie, as she was the first teenage girl in the White House since Abby Fillmore.

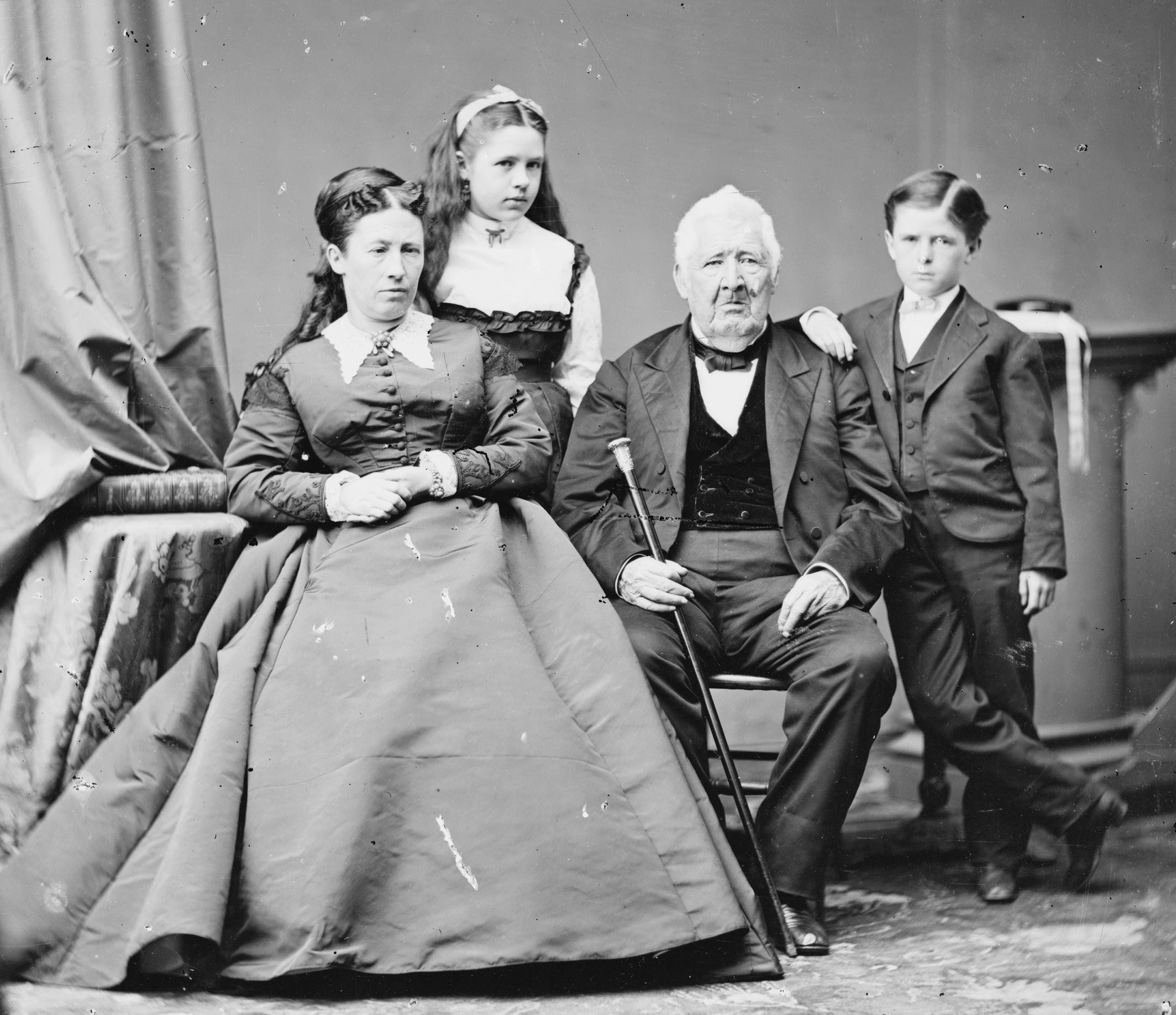
Nellie as a child with her mother, grandfather Frederick, and brother Jesse

Because she was their only daughter, with three brothers, the Grants sent Nellie to Miss Porter's School, an elite boarding school for girls in Connecticut. The situation did not last long after Nellie sent three distressing telegrams to Grant, who relented, and sent an escort to bring Nellie back to the White House. Washington society was shocked when Nellie danced through the night at a society ball. President Grant, her father, however, did not rebuke her. When Nellie turned 16, President Grant was concerned when there were many young suitors who pursued his only daughter.

To keep Nellie out of the limelight, Grant sent her on a trip abroad to England surrounded by trusted chaperones. In England, Nellie was received by Queen Victoria and she attended many garden parties. Victoria described Nellie as "rather stiff and off hand in her manner and spoke with a great twang." On the voyage home she met her future husband Algernon Charles Frederick Sartoris, an Englishman of "minor gentry", and potential heir to his family's fortune. Sartoris's mother was Adelaide Kemble, a former opera singer, and sister of the famous actress Fanny Kemble. Sartoris's father Edward was a member of Parliament and served as a British European court minister. Grant had initially opposed Sartoris's courtship and engagement to his daughter, having learned from his parents that he was a "drinker". Grant, himself, had a reputation of drinking and had battled rumors of alcoholism throughout his life. Grant also did not want his daughter to live in England. When Grant invited Sartoris to the White House to play billiards, Sartoris told Grant he wanted to marry Nellie. Both Julia and President Grant had the premonition that there was something not quite right with Sartoris. Grant finally relented and on July 7, 1873, writing to Sartoris's father, he gave his daughter permission to marry Sartoris on condition that they wait at least a year. Grant was concerned about Sartoris not having permanent employment and that he would have to support Nellie on his presidential salary.

=== Wedding ===
At the age of 18, Nellie and 23-year-old Algernon were married in a lavish wedding held at the White House on May 21, 1874. The interior of the White House, including the walls, staircases, and chandeliers were covered with lilies, tuberoses, and spirea. Orange blossoms from Florida had been crated up and sent North to the White House. The bride Nellie was described as "probably the most attractive of all the young woman who have ever lived in the White House." The Marine Band played Mendelssohn's Wedding March, while President Grant escorted Nellie to the East Room, filled with 250 guests. Nellie's wedding dress, trimmed in Brussel pointed lace, was reportedly worth thousands of dollars. After the wedding, the newlywed couple traveled on a special train to New York in a Pullman palace car, especially made for the Vienna Exposition, covered by British and American flags. The following day Nellie and Sartoris sailed for England. After the wedding, President Grant went to his daughter's bedroom and sobbed uncontrollably. One historian, a hundred years later, said Nellie had been "sold at a low price."

== Marriages and family ==
=== Algernon Sartoris ===
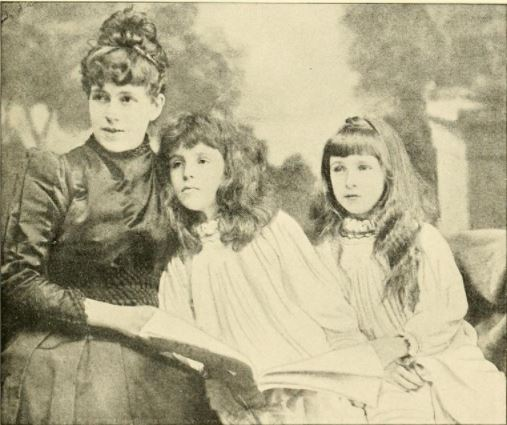
Grant and her daughters, 1895

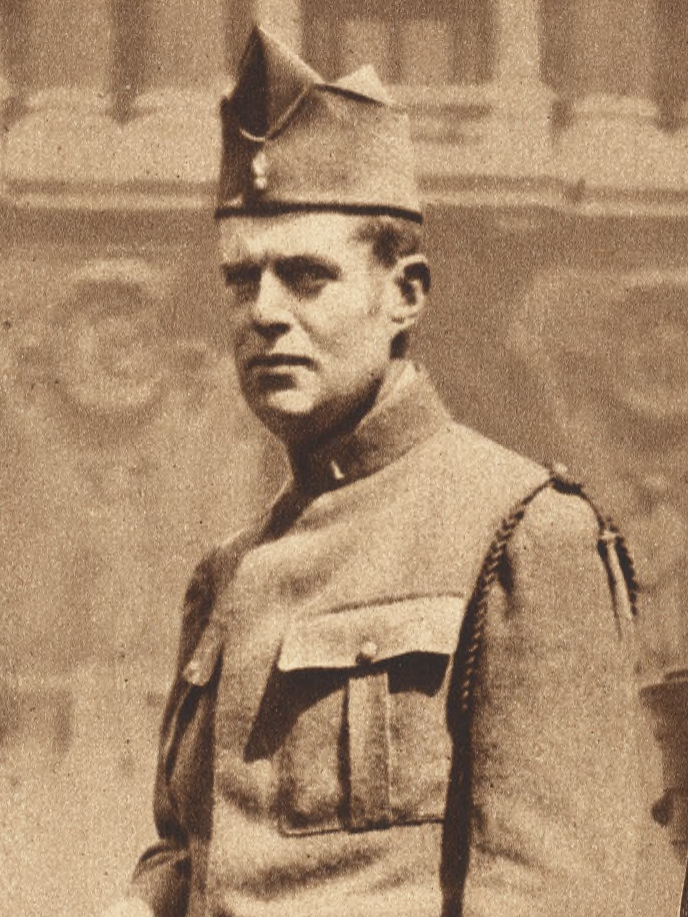
Captain Algernon Sartoris in World War I

Grant and Sartoris had four children together, two sons and two daughters:

- Grant Grenville Edward Sartoris (1875–1876)
- Algernon Edward Sartoris (1877–1928) who married Cecille Nouffland
- Vivien May Sartoris (1879–1933), who married Frederick Roosevelt Scovel, a grandson of judge James John Roosevelt and second cousin of President Theodore Roosevelt
- Rosemary Alice Sartoris (1880–1914), who married George Henry Woolston.

Nellie Grant and Sartoris lived together in England. She never fully accepted English society, or had the admiration of the British people that her parents had. Her mother-in-law Adelaide Kemble Sartoris took Nellie under her wing. When author Henry James visited the family at Adelaide's home in Southampton, he described having a brilliant dinner conversation, but added "poor little Nellie Grant sits speechless on the sofa, understanding neither head nor tail." Family tradition concerning Nellie's husband was that in addition to having a drinking problem he was a womanizer.

By 1889, Sartoris's drinking problem was out of control; the storybook marriage that charmed both the British and American public had ended. Sartoris proved dissolute and a disappointment to his parents, who made it clear that they did not blame Nellie for the breakup. Nellie, who longed to return to the United States, was granted a divorce, given a large annual income, and allowed to take her children back to the United States, where she was given renewed citizenship by a special act of Congress.

Sartoris died in 1893 at the age of forty-two, leaving Nellie Grant free to remarry.

=== Second marriage ===
In 1912, Nellie married Frank Hatch Jones, a lawyer originally from Springfield, Illinois, who lived in Chicago. He was a Yale University graduate, who was Chairman of the Sangamon County Democratic Committee, President of the State League of Democratic Clubs of Illinois and Secretary of the Illinois State Bar Association.

== Later life ==
Nellie had returned to the United States from England to be with her sick father and American family. In 1885, ex-President Grant was dying of throat cancer while he was writing his memoirs. At the time of her father's death, she was honored with a popular poem "Nellie" by the writer Eugene Field. Nellie Grant died in Springfield, Illinois on August 30, 1922, at the age of 67. She is buried In Oak Ridge Cemetery.
