= Ulysses S. Grant =

Civil War general, U.S. president from 1869 to 1877

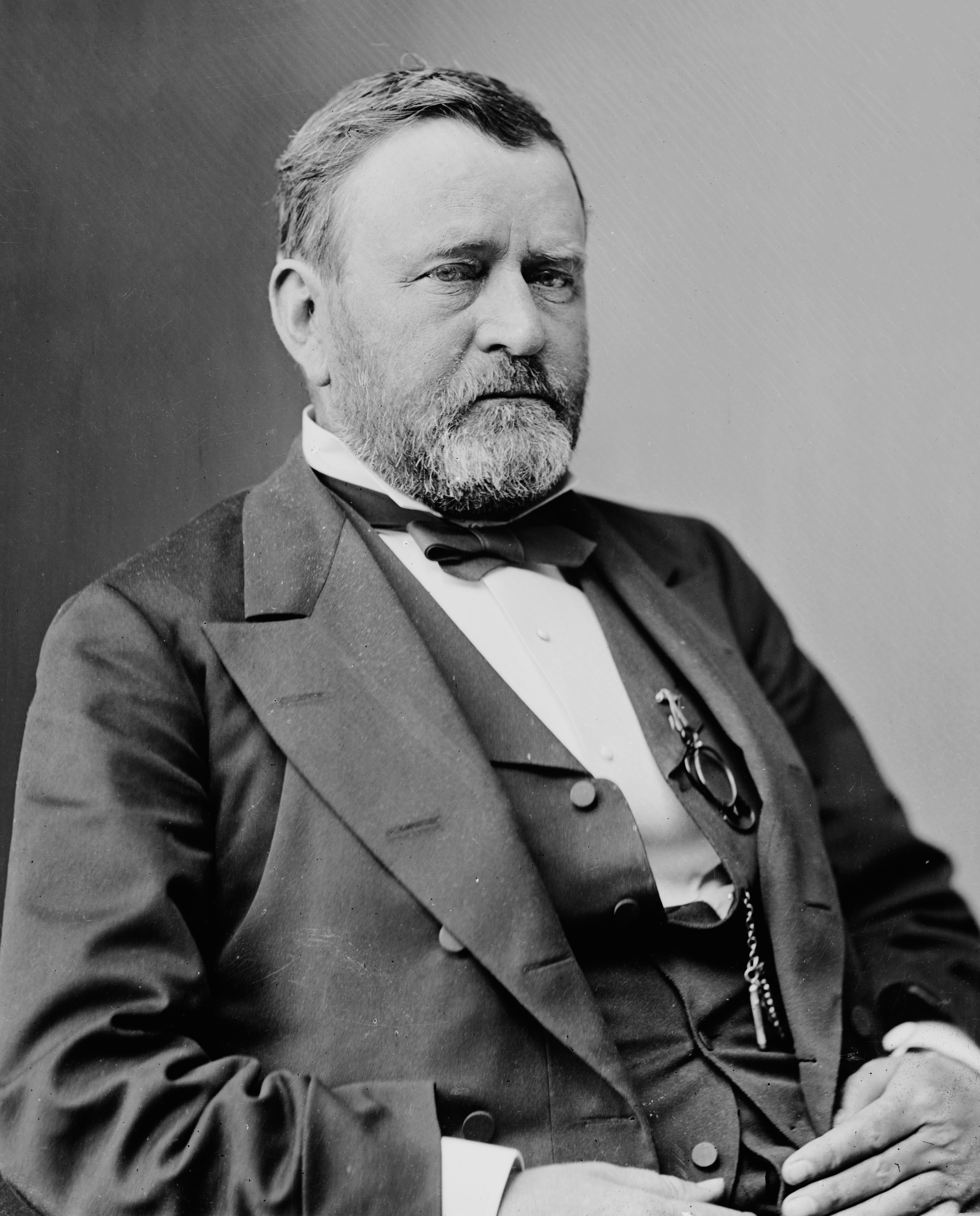
- Grant, c. 1870–1880

18th President of the United States
- In office March 4, 1869 – March 4, 1877
- Vice President: Schuyler Colfax (1869–1873); Henry Wilson (1873–1875); Vacant (1875–1877) (Note: Vice President Wilson died in office. As this was prior to the adoption of the Twenty-fifth Amendment in 1967, a vacancy in the office of vice president was not filled until the next ensuing election and inauguration.)
- Preceded by: Andrew Johnson
- Succeeded by: Rutherford B. Hayes

Commanding General of the U.S. Army
- In office March 9, 1864 – March 4, 1869
- President: Abraham Lincoln; Andrew Johnson
- Preceded by: Henry Halleck
- Succeeded by: William Tecumseh Sherman

Acting United States Secretary of War
- In office August 12, 1867 – January 14, 1868
- President: Andrew Johnson
- Preceded by: Edwin Stanton
- Succeeded by: Edwin Stanton

President of the National Rifle Association
- In office 1883–1884
- Preceded by: Edward L. Molineux
- Succeeded by: Philip Sheridan

Personal details
- Born: Hiram Ulysses Grant; April 27, 1822 Point Pleasant, Ohio, U.S.
- Died: July 23, 1885 (aged 63) Grant Cottage, Moreau, New York, U.S.
- Resting place: Grant's Tomb, New York City
- Party: Republican
- Spouse: Julia Dent (m. 1848)
- Children: Frederick; Ulysses Jr.; Nellie; Jesse II
- Parents: Jesse Root Grant; Hannah Simpson Grant
- Education: United States Military Academy
- Occupation: Military officer; politician
- Nicknames: Sam; Unconditional Surrender

Military service
- Allegiance: United States; Union
- Branch/service: United States Army; Union Army
- Years of service: 1839–1854; 1861–1869
- Rank: General of the Armies
- Commands: United States Army; Division of the Mississippi; Army of the Tennessee; District of Cairo; District of Southeast Missouri; 21st Illinois Infantry Regiment; 4th Infantry Regiment
- Battles/wars: See list: Mexican–American War; Battle of Palo Alto; Battle of Resaca de la Palma; Battle of Monterrey; Battle of Molino del Rey; Battle of Chapultepec; American Civil War; Battle of Belmont; Battle of Fort Henry; Battle of Fort Donelson; Battle of Shiloh; Siege of Corinth; Vicksburg campaign; Battle of Port Gibson; Battle of Jackson; Battle of Champion Hill; Siege of Vicksburg; Chattanooga campaign; Battle of Missionary Ridge; Overland Campaign; Battle of the Wilderness; Battle of Spotsylvania; Battle of North Anna; Battle of Totopotomoy Creek; Battle of Cold Harbor; Petersburg campaign; Second Battle of Petersburg; Second Battle of Deep Bottom; Battle of Chaffin's Farm; Battle of Darbytown and New Market Roads; Battle of Boydton Plank Road; Battle of Trent's Reach; Appomattox campaign; Third Battle of Petersburg; Battle of Appomattox Court House

Ulysses S. Grant (born Hiram Ulysses Grant; (Note: Pronounced /ˈhaɪrəm juːˈlɪsiːz/ HY-rəm yoo-LISS-eez) April 27, 1822 – July 23, 1885) was the 18th president of the United States, serving from 1869 to 1877, and was the Commanding General of the Union Army. He led the army to victory in the American Civil War in 1865.

Grant was born in Ohio and graduated from the United States Military Academy in 1843. He served with distinction in the Mexican–American War, but returned to civilian life impoverished in 1854. In 1861, shortly after the Civil War began, Grant joined the Union Army. He rose to prominence after securing victories in the western theater in 1862. In 1863, he led the Vicksburg campaign that gave Union forces control of the Mississippi River and dealt a major strategic blow to the Confederacy. President Abraham Lincoln promoted Grant to lieutenant general and command of all Union armies after his victory at Chattanooga. Grant fought Robert E. Lee through the Overland Campaign, which ended when Lee surrendered to Grant at Appomattox. In 1866, President Andrew Johnson promoted Grant to General of the Army. Grant broke with Johnson over Reconstruction policies. A war hero, drawn in by his sense of duty, Grant was unanimously nominated by the Republican Party and elected president in 1868.

As president, Grant stabilized the post-war economy, supported Reconstruction and the Fifteenth Amendment, and prosecuted the Ku Klux Klan. An effective civil rights executive, Grant signed a bill to create the United States Department of Justice and worked with Radical Republicans to protect African Americans. In 1871, he created the first Civil Service Commission. Grant was re-elected in the 1872 presidential election, but was inundated by executive scandals during his second term. His response to the Panic of 1873 was ineffective in halting the Long Depression, which contributed to the Democrats winning the House majority in 1874. Grant's Native American policy was to assimilate Indians into Anglo-American culture. In his foreign policy, the Alabama Claims against Britain were peacefully resolved, but the Senate rejected his proposal to annex Santo Domingo. During the disputed 1876 presidential election, he facilitated the approval by Congress of a compromise.

Leaving office in 1877, Grant undertook a world tour, becoming the first president to circumnavigate the world. In 1880, he was unsuccessful in obtaining the Republican nomination for a third term. In 1885, dying of throat cancer, Grant wrote his memoirs, which were posthumously published and became a major critical and financial success. At his death, he was the most popular American and was memorialized as a symbol of national unity. Due to the pseudohistorical and negationist mythology of the Lost Cause of the Confederacy spread by Confederate sympathizers around the turn of the 20th century, historical assessments and rankings of Grant's presidency suffered considerably before they began recovering in the 21st century.

== Early life and education ==
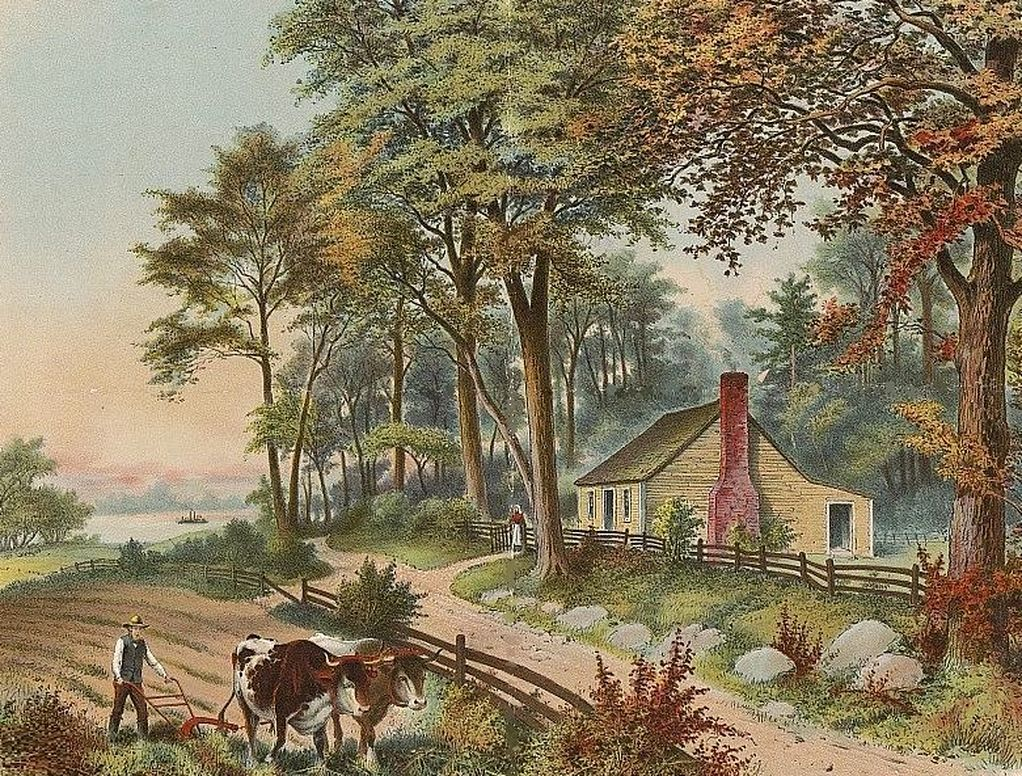
Grant's birthplace in Point Pleasant, Ohio

Grant's father, Jesse Root Grant, was a Whig Party supporter and a fervent abolitionist. He and Hannah Simpson were married on June 24, 1821, and their first child, Hiram Ulysses Grant, was born on April 27, 1822. To honor his father-in-law, Jesse named the boy "Hiram Ulysses", though he always referred to him as "Ulysses". In 1823, the family moved to Georgetown, Ohio, where five siblings were born: Simpson, Clara, Orvil, Jennie, and Mary. At the age of five, Ulysses started at a subscription school and later attended two private schools. In the winter of 1836–1837, Grant was a student at Maysville Seminary, and in the autumn of 1838, he attended John Rankin's academy.

In his youth, Grant developed an unusual ability to ride and manage horses; his father gave him work driving supply wagons and transporting people. Unlike his siblings, Grant was not required to attend church by his Methodist parents. For the rest of his life, he prayed privately and never officially joined any denomination. To others, including his own son, Grant appeared to be agnostic. Grant was largely apolitical before the war but wrote, "If I had ever had any political sympathies they would have been with the Whigs. I was raised in that school."

== Early military career and personal life ==
=== West Point and first assignment ===
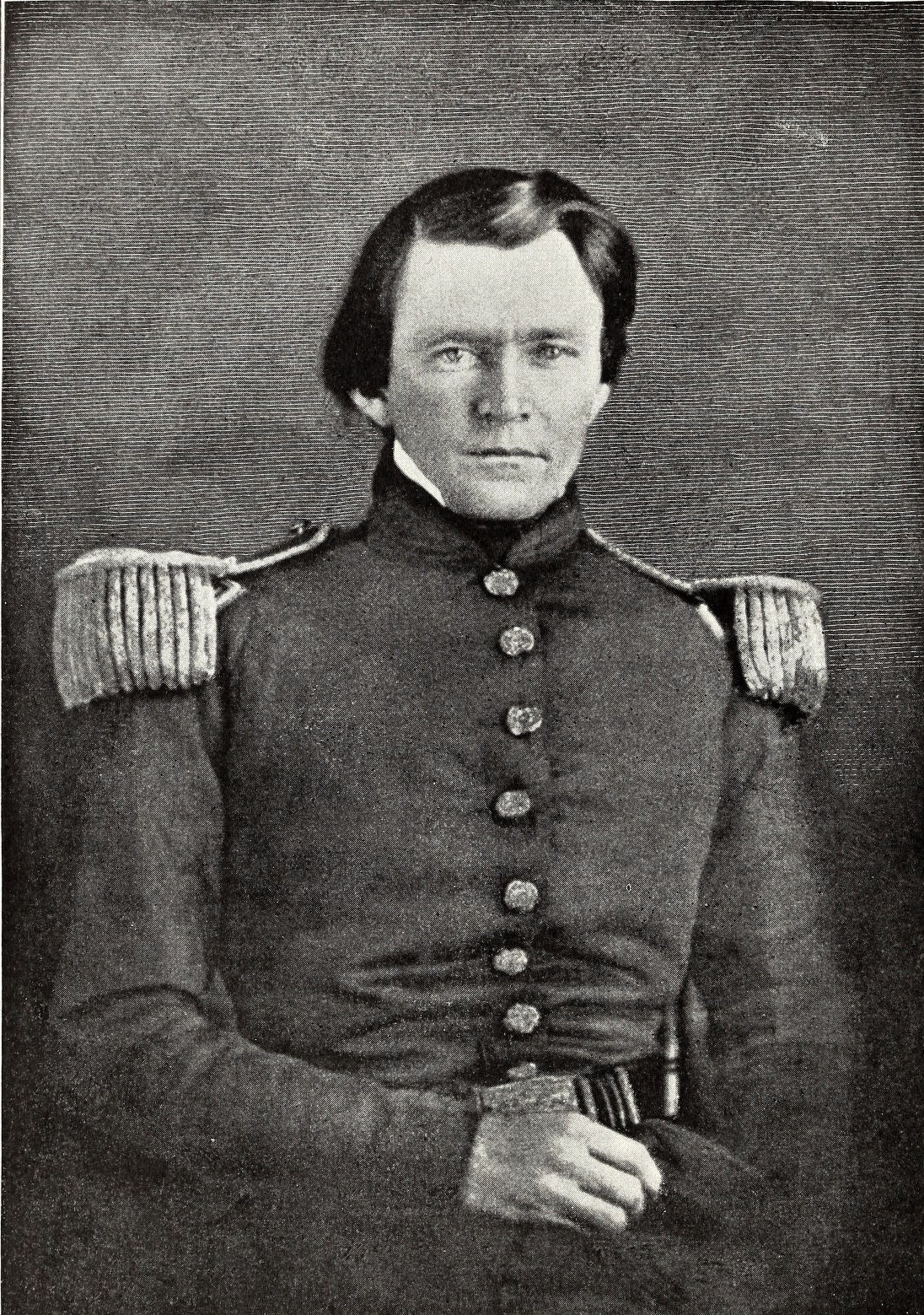
Grant as a young officer, c. 1845–1847

At Jesse Grant's request, Representative Thomas L. Hamer nominated Ulysses to the United States Military Academy at West Point, New York, in spring 1839. Grant was accepted on July 1. Unfamiliar with Grant, Hamer altered his name, so Grant was enlisted under the name "U. S. Grant". (Note: One source states Hamer took the "S" from Simpson, Grant's mother's maiden name. According to Grant, the "S." did not stand for anything. Upon graduation from the academy he adopted the name "Ulysses S. Grant". Another version of the story states that Grant inverted his first and middle names to register at West Point as "Ulysses Hiram Grant" as he thought reporting to the academy with a trunk that carried the initials H.U.G. would subject him to teasing and ridicule. Upon finding that Hamer had nominated him as "Ulysses S. Grant," Grant decided to keep the name so that he could avoid the "hug" monogram; and it was easier to keep the wrong name than to try changing school records.) Since the initials "U.S." also stood for "Uncle Sam", he became known among army colleagues as "Sam."

Initially, Grant was indifferent to military life, but within a year he reexamined his desire to leave the academy and later wrote that "on the whole I like this place very much". He earned a reputation as the "most proficient" horseman. Seeking relief from military routine, he studied under Romantic artist Robert Walter Weir, producing nine surviving artworks. He spent more time reading books from the library than his academic texts. On Sundays, cadets were required to march to services at the academy's church, which Grant disliked. Quiet by nature, he established a few intimate friends among fellow cadets, including Frederick Tracy Dent and James Longstreet. He was inspired both by the Commandant, Captain Charles Ferguson Smith, and by General Winfield Scott, who visited the academy to review the cadets. Grant later wrote of the military life, "there is much to dislike, but more to like."

Grant graduated on June 30, 1843, ranked 21st out of 39 in his class and was promoted the next day to brevet second lieutenant. He planned to resign his commission after his four-year term. He would later write that among the happiest days of his life were the day he left the presidency and the day he left the academy. Despite his excellent horsemanship, he was not assigned to the cavalry, but to the 4th Infantry Regiment. (Note: At the time, class ranking largely determined branch assignments. Those at the top of the class were usually assigned to the Engineers, followed by Artillery, Cavalry, and Infantry.) Grant's first assignment was the Jefferson Barracks near St. Louis, Missouri. Commanded by Colonel Stephen W. Kearny, this was the nation's largest military base in the West. Grant was happy with his commander but looked forward to the end of his military service and a possible teaching career.

=== Marriage and family ===
In 1844, Grant accompanied Frederick Dent to Missouri and met his family, including Dent's sister Julia. The two soon became engaged. On August 22, 1848, they were married at Julia's home in St. Louis. Grant's abolitionist father disapproved of the Dents' owning slaves, and neither of Grant's parents attended the wedding. Grant was flanked by three fellow West Point graduates in their blue uniforms, including Longstreet, Julia's cousin. (Note: Several scholars, including Jean Edward Smith and Ron Chernow, state that Longstreet was Grant's best man and the two other officers were Grant's groomsmen. All three went on to serve in the Confederate Army and surrendered to Grant at Appomattox.)

The couple had four children: Frederick, Ulysses Jr. ("Buck"), Ellen ("Nellie"), and Jesse II. After the wedding, Grant obtained a two-month extension to his leave and returned to St. Louis, where he decided that, with a wife to support, he would remain in the army.

=== Mexican–American War ===
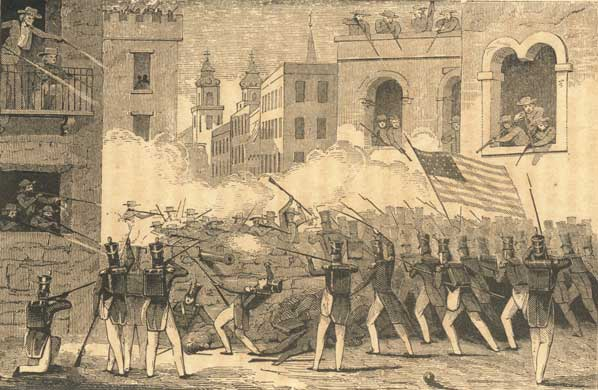
The Battle of Monterrey during which Grant saw military action

Grant's unit was stationed in Louisiana as part of the Army of Occupation under Major General Zachary Taylor. In September 1846, President James K. Polk ordered Taylor to march 150 miles (240 km) south to the Rio Grande. Marching to Fort Texas, to prevent a Mexican siege, Grant experienced combat for the first time on May 8, 1846, at the Battle of Palo Alto. Grant served as regimental quartermaster, but yearned for a combat role; when finally allowed, he led a charge at the Battle of Resaca de la Palma. He demonstrated his equestrian ability at the Battle of Monterrey by volunteering to carry a dispatch past snipers; he hung off the side of his horse, keeping the animal between him and the enemy. Polk, wary of Taylor's growing popularity, divided his forces, sending some troops (including Grant's unit) to form a new army under Major General Winfield Scott.

Traveling by sea, Scott's army landed at Veracruz and advanced toward Mexico City. They met the Mexican forces at the battles of Molino del Rey and Chapultepec. For his bravery at Molino del Rey, Grant was brevetted first lieutenant on September 30. At San Cosmé, Grant directed his men to drag a disassembled mountain howitzer into a church steeple, then reassembled it and bombarded nearby Mexican troops. His bravery and initiative earned him his brevet promotion to captain. On September 14, 1847, Scott's army marched into the city; Mexico ceded the vast territory, including California, to the U.S. on February 2, 1848. During the war, Grant established a commendable record as a daring and competent soldier and began to consider a career in the army. He studied the tactics and strategies of Scott and Taylor and emerged as a seasoned officer, writing in his memoirs that this is how he learned much about military leadership. In retrospect, although he respected Scott, he identified his own leadership style with Taylor's. Grant later believed the Mexican war was morally unjust and that the territorial gains were designed to expand slavery. He opined that the Civil War was divine punishment for U.S. aggression against Mexico.

Historians have pointed to the importance of Grant's experience as an assistant quartermaster during the war. Although he was initially averse to the position, it prepared Grant in understanding military supply routes, transportation systems, and logistics, particularly with regard to "provisioning a large, mobile army operating in hostile territory", according to biographer Ronald White. Grant came to recognize how wars could be won or lost by factors beyond the battlefield.

=== Post-war assignments and resignation ===
Grant's first post-war assignments took him and Julia to Detroit on November 17, 1848. He was soon transferred to Madison Barracks, a desolate outpost in upstate New York in need of supplies and repair. After four months, Grant was sent back to his quartermaster job in Detroit. When the discovery of gold in California brought prospectors and settlers to the territory, Grant and the 4th infantry were ordered to reinforce the small garrison there. Grant was charged with bringing the soldiers and a few hundred civilians from New York City to Panama, overland to the Pacific and then north to California. Julia, eight months pregnant with Ulysses Jr., did not accompany him.

While Grant was in Panama, a cholera epidemic killed many soldiers and civilians. Grant organized a field hospital in Panama City, and moved the worst cases to a hospital barge offshore. When orderlies protested having to attend to the sick, Grant did much of the nursing himself, earning high praise from observers. In August, Grant arrived in San Francisco. His next assignment sent him north to Vancouver Barracks in the Oregon Territory.

Grant tried several business ventures but failed, and in one instance his business partner absconded with $800 of Grant's investment, equivalent to $24,000 in 2025. After he witnessed white agents cheating local Indians of their supplies, and their devastation from smallpox and measles spread by white settlers, he developed empathy for their plight.

Promoted to captain on August 5, 1853, Grant was assigned to command Company F, 4th Infantry, at the newly constructed Fort Humboldt in California. Grant arrived at Fort Humboldt on January 5, 1854, commanded by Lieutenant Colonel Robert C. Buchanan. Separated from his family, Grant began to drink. Colonel Buchanan reprimanded Grant for one drinking episode and told Grant to "resign or reform." Grant told Buchanan he would "resign if I don't reform." On Sunday, Grant was found influenced by alcohol, but not incapacitated, at his company's paytable. Keeping his pledge to Buchanan, Grant resigned, effective July 31, 1854. Buchanan endorsed Grant's resignation but did not submit any report that verified the incident. (Note: William McFeely said that Grant left the army simply because he was "profoundly depressed" and that the evidence as to how much and how often Grant drank remains elusive. Jean Edward Smith maintains Grant's resignation was too sudden to be a calculated decision. Buchanan never mentioned it again until asked about it during the Civil War. The effects and extent of Grant's drinking on his military and public career are debated by historians. Lyle Dorsett said Grant was an "alcoholic" but functioned amazingly well. William Farina maintains Grant's devotion to family kept him from drinking to excess and sinking into debt.) Grant did not face court-martial, and the War Department said: "Nothing stands against his good name." Grant said years later, "the vice of intemperance (drunkenness) had not a little to do with my decision to resign." With no means of support, Grant returned to St. Louis and reunited with his family.

== Civilian struggles, slavery, and politics ==
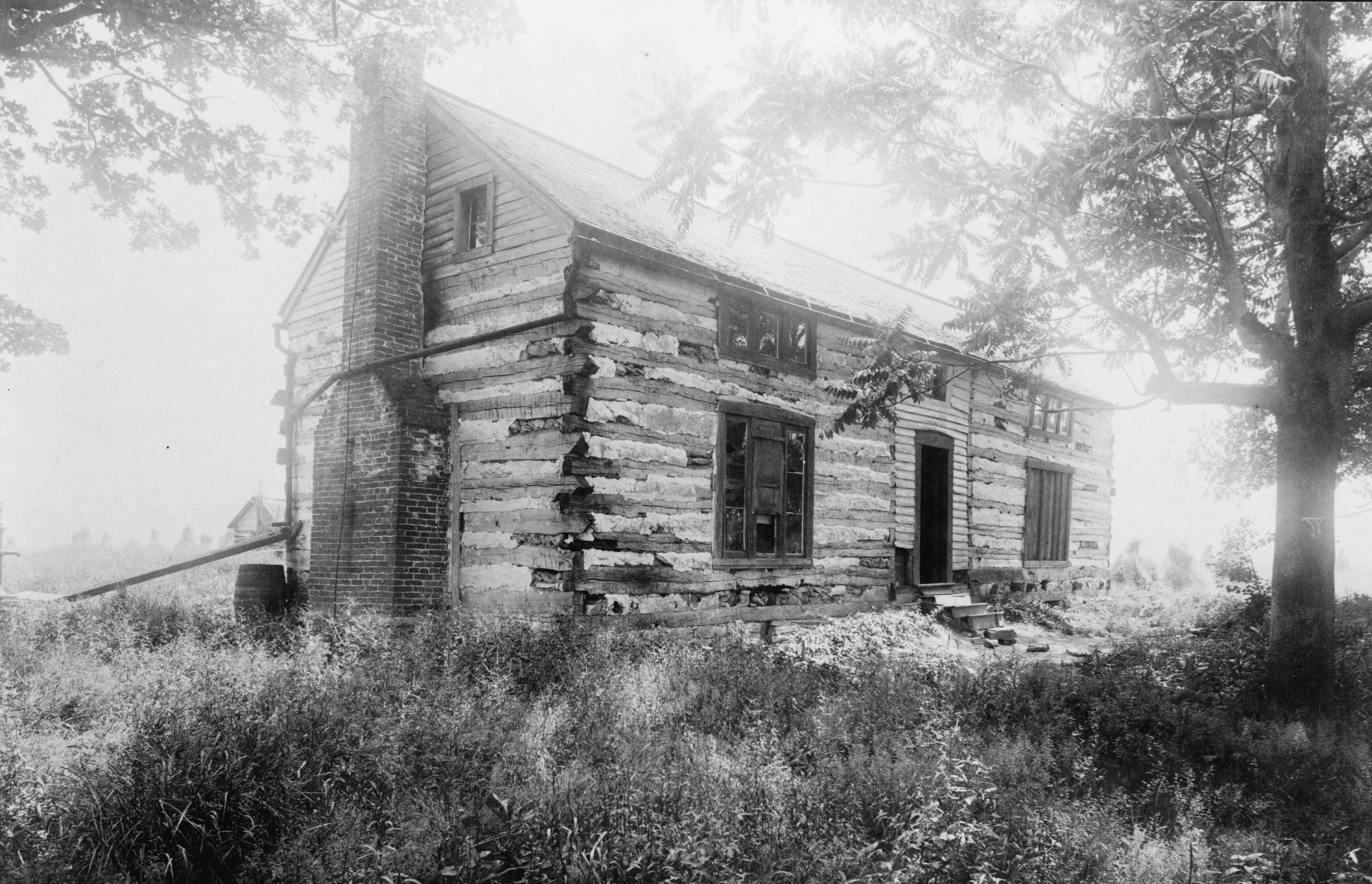
"Hardscrabble", the log house built by Grant in between wars

In 1854, aged 32, Grant entered civilian life without any money-making vocation to support his growing family. It was the beginning of seven years of financial struggles and instability. Grant's father offered him a place in the Galena, Illinois, branch of the family's leather business, but demanded Julia and the children stay in Missouri, with the Dents, or with the Grants in Kentucky. Grant and Julia declined. For the next four years, Grant farmed with the help of Julia's slave, Dan, on his brother-in-law's property, Wish-ton-wish, near St. Louis. The farm was not successful and to earn a living he sold firewood on St. Louis street corners.

In 1856, the Grants moved to land on Julia's father's farm, and built a home called "Hardscrabble" on Grant's Farm; Julia described it as an "unattractive cabin". Grant's family had little money, clothes, and furniture, but always had enough food. During the Panic of 1857, which devastated Grant as it did many farmers, Grant pawned his gold watch to buy Christmas gifts. In 1858, Grant rented out Hardscrabble and moved his family to Julia's father's 850-acre plantation. That fall, after having malaria, Grant gave up farming. Fearing that electing a Republican president would lead to a civil war, he voted for Democrat James Buchanan in 1856. He had the same fear in 1860 and preferred Douglas, the Democrat. However, he did not vote in 1860 because he lacked the residency requirement in Galena.

In 1858, Grant acquired a slave from his father-in-law, a thirty-five-year-old man named William Jones. Although Grant was not an abolitionist at the time, he disliked slavery and could not bring himself to force an enslaved man to work. In March 1859, Grant freed Jones by a manumission deed, potentially worth at least $1,000 (equivalent to $36,000 in 2025).

Grant moved to St. Louis, taking on a partnership with Julia's cousin Harry Boggs working in the real estate business as a bill collector, again without success and at Julia's prompting ended the partnership. In August, Grant applied for a position as county engineer. He had thirty-five recommendations, but Grant was passed over by the Free Soil and Republican county commissioners because he was believed to share his father-in-law's Democratic sentiments.

In April 1860, Grant and his family moved north to Galena, accepting a position in his father's leather goods business, "Grant & Perkins", run by his younger brothers Simpson and Orvil. In a few months, Grant paid off his debts. The family attended the local Methodist church and he soon established himself as a reputable citizen.

== Civil War ==
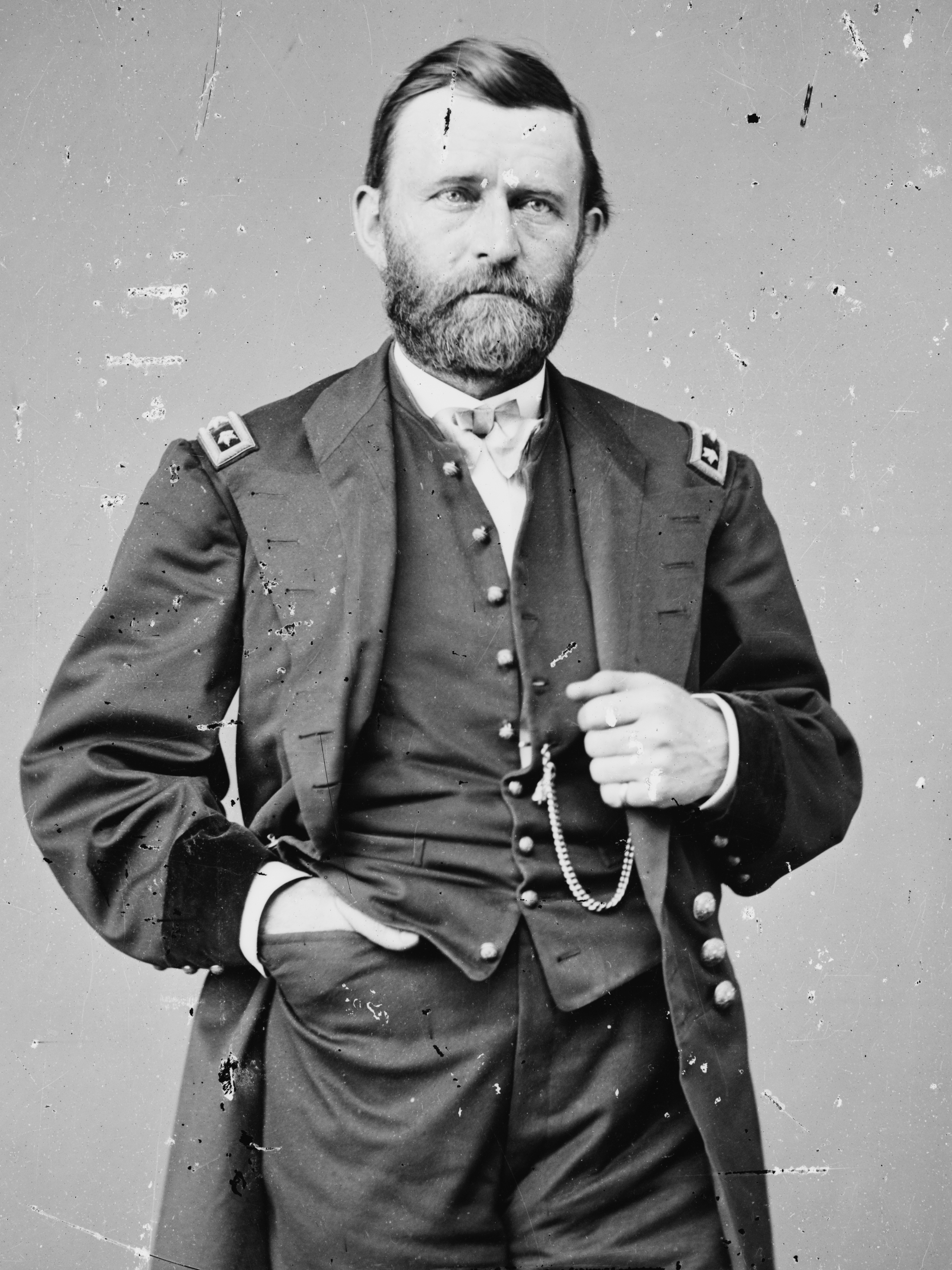
Portrait of General Grant, c. 1864–1865

On April 12, 1861, the American Civil War began when Confederate troops attacked Fort Sumter in Charleston, South Carolina. The news came as a shock in Galena, and Grant shared his neighbors' concern about the war. On April 15, Lincoln called for 75,000 volunteers. The next day, Grant attended a mass meeting to assess the crisis and encourage recruitment, and a speech by his father's attorney, John Aaron Rawlins, stirred Grant's patriotism. In an April 21 letter to his father, Grant wrote out his views on the upcoming conflict: "We have a government and laws and a flag, and they must all be sustained. There are but two parties now, Traitors and Patriots."

=== Early commands ===
On April 18, Grant chaired a second recruitment meeting, but turned down a captain's position as commander of the newly formed militia company, hoping his experience would aid him to obtain a more senior rank. His early efforts to be recommissioned were rejected by Major General George B. McClellan and Brigadier General Nathaniel Lyon. On April 29, supported by Congressman Elihu B. Washburne of Illinois, Grant was appointed military aide to Governor Richard Yates and mustered ten regiments into the Illinois militia. On June 14, again aided by Washburne, Grant was appointed colonel and put in charge of the 21st Illinois Volunteer Infantry Regiment; he appointed John A. Rawlins as his aide-de-camp and brought order and discipline to the regiment. Soon after, Grant and the 21st Regiment were transferred to Missouri to dislodge Confederate forces.

On August 5, with Washburne's aid, Grant was appointed brigadier general of volunteers. Major General John C. Frémont, Union commander of the West, passed over senior generals and appointed Grant commander of the District of Southeastern Missouri. On September 2, Grant arrived at Cairo, Illinois, assumed command by replacing Colonel Richard J. Oglesby, and set up his headquarters to plan a campaign down the Mississippi, and up the Tennessee and Cumberland rivers.

After the Confederates moved into western Kentucky, taking Columbus, with designs on southern Illinois, Grant notified Frémont and, without waiting for his reply, advanced on Paducah, Kentucky, taking it without a fight on September 6. Understanding the importance to Lincoln of Kentucky's neutrality, Grant assured its citizens, "I have come among you not as your enemy, but as your friend." On November 1, Frémont ordered Grant to "make demonstrations" against the Confederates on both sides of the Mississippi, but prohibited him from attacking.

=== Belmont (1861), Forts Henry and Donelson (1862) ===
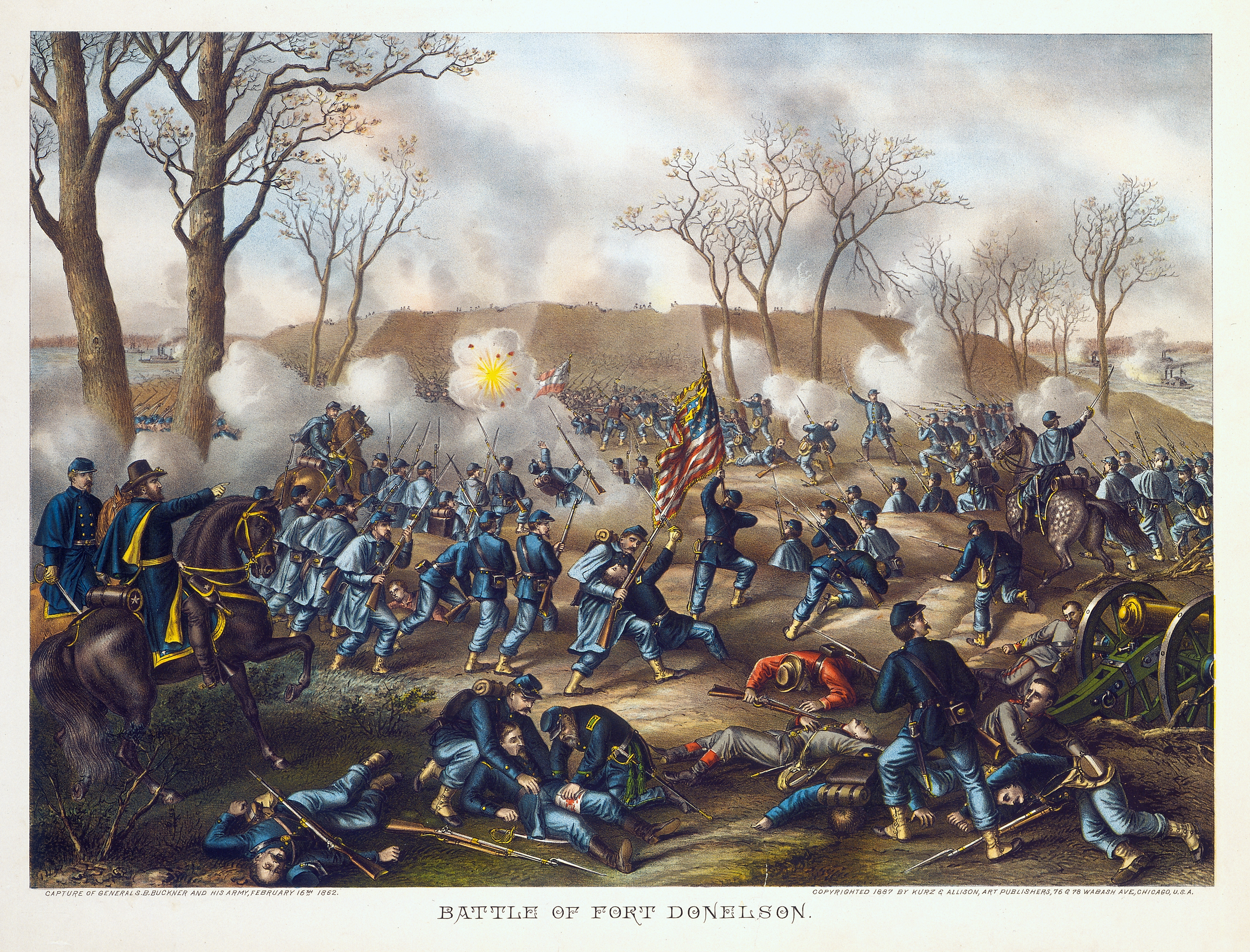
Battle of Fort Donelson by Kurz and Allison, 1887

On November 2, 1861, Lincoln removed Frémont from command, freeing Grant to attack Confederate soldiers encamped in Cape Girardeau, Missouri. On November 5, Grant, along with Brigadier General John A. McClernand, landed 2,500 men at Hunter's Point, and on November 7 engaged the Confederates at the Battle of Belmont. The Union army took the camp, but the reinforced Confederates under Brigadier Generals Frank Cheatham and Gideon J. Pillow forced a chaotic Union retreat. Grant had wanted to destroy Confederate strongholds at Belmont, Missouri, and Columbus, Kentucky, but was not given enough troops and was only able to disrupt their positions. Grant's troops escaped back to Cairo under fire from the fortified stronghold at Columbus. Although Grant and his army retreated, the battle gave his volunteers much-needed confidence and experience.

Columbus blocked Union access to the lower Mississippi. Grant and lieutenant colonel James B. McPherson planned to bypass Columbus and move against Fort Henry on the Tennessee River. They would then march east to Fort Donelson on the Cumberland River, with the aid of gunboats, opening both rivers and allowing the Union access further south. Grant presented his plan to Henry Halleck, his new commander in the newly created Department of Missouri. Halleck rebuffed Grant, believing he needed twice the number of troops. However, after consulting McClellan, he finally agreed on the condition that the attack would be in close cooperation with Navy flag officer Andrew H. Foote. Foote's gunboats bombarded Fort Henry, leading to its surrender on February 6, 1862, before Grant's infantry even arrived.

Grant ordered an immediate assault on Fort Donelson, which dominated the Cumberland River. Unaware of the garrison's strength, Grant, McClernand, and Smith positioned their divisions around the fort. The next day McClernand and Smith independently launched probing attacks on apparent weak spots but were forced to retreat. On February 14, Foote's gunboats began bombarding the fort, only to be repulsed by its heavy guns. The next day, Pillow attacked and routed McClernand's division. Union reinforcements arrived, giving Grant a total force of over 40,000 men. Grant was with Foote four miles away when the Confederates attacked. Hearing the battle, Grant rode back and rallied his troop commanders, riding over seven miles of freezing roads and trenches, exchanging reports. When Grant blocked the Nashville Road, the Confederates retreated back into Fort Donelson. On February 16, Foote resumed his bombardment, signaling a general attack. Confederate generals John B. Floyd and Pillow fled, leaving the fort in command of Simon Bolivar Buckner, who submitted to Grant's demand for "unconditional and immediate surrender".

Grant had won the first major victory for the Union, capturing Floyd's entire army of more than 12,000. Halleck was angry that Grant had acted without his authorization and complained to McClellan, accusing Grant of "neglect and inefficiency". On March 3, Halleck sent a telegram to Washington complaining that he had no communication with Grant for a week. Three days later, Halleck claimed "word has just reached me that ... Grant has resumed his bad habits (of drinking)." Lincoln, regardless, promoted Grant to major general of volunteers and the Northern press treated Grant as a hero. Playing off his initials, they took to calling him "Unconditional Surrender Grant".

=== Shiloh (1862) and aftermath ===
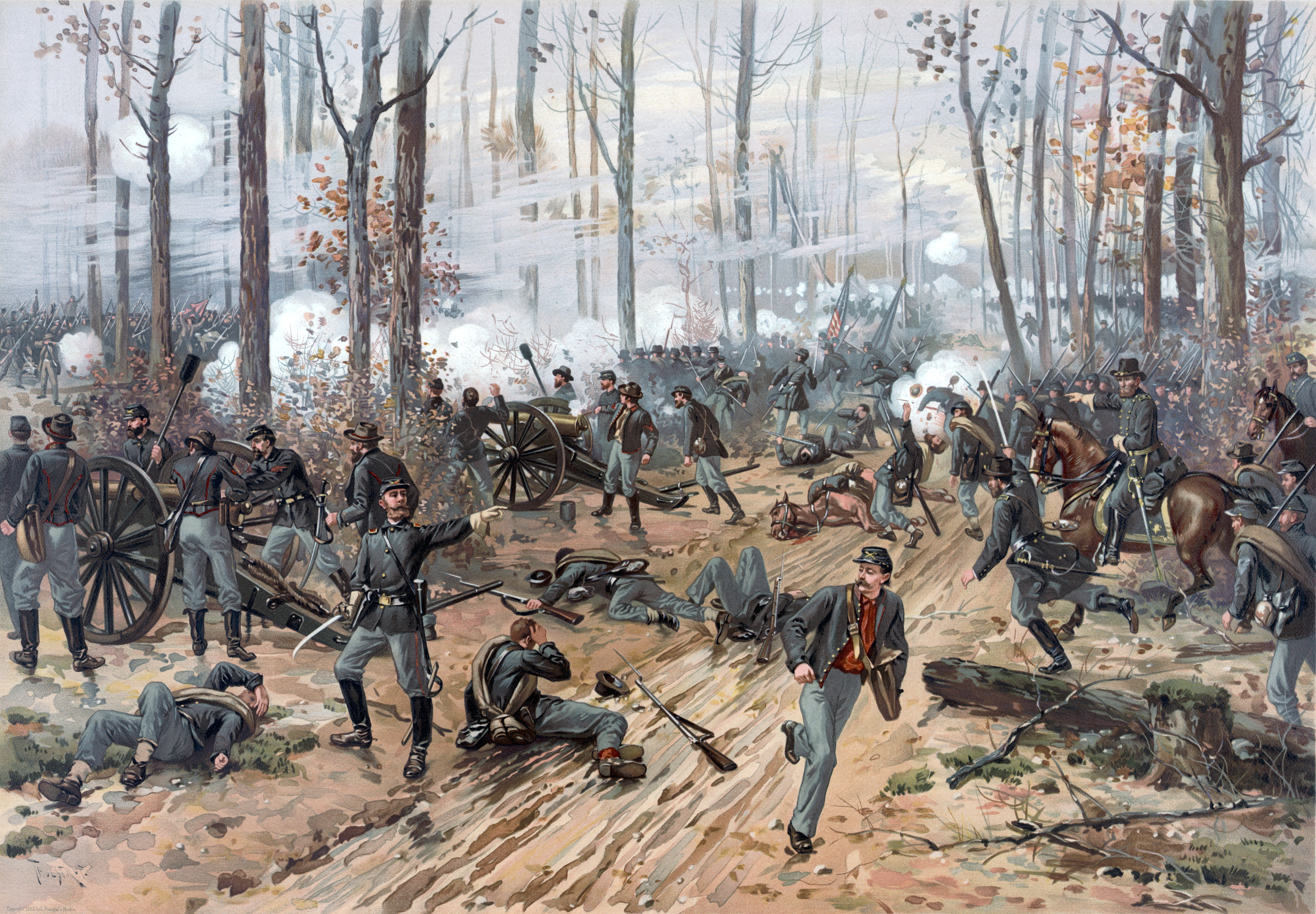
Battle of Shiloh by Thure de Thulstrup, 1888

Reinstated by Halleck at the urging of Lincoln and Secretary of War Edwin Stanton, Grant rejoined his army with orders to advance with the Army of the Tennessee into Tennessee. His main army was located at Pittsburg Landing, while 40,000 Confederate troops converged at Corinth, Mississippi. Grant wanted to attack the Confederates at Corinth, but Halleck ordered him not to attack until Major General Don Carlos Buell arrived with his division of 25,000. Grant prepared for an attack on the Confederate army of roughly equal strength. Instead of preparing defensive fortifications, they spent most of their time drilling the largely inexperienced troops while Sherman dismissed reports of nearby Confederates.

On the morning of April 6, 1862, Grant's troops were taken by surprise when the Confederates, led by Generals Albert Sidney Johnston and P. G. T. Beauregard, struck first "like an Alpine avalanche" near Shiloh church, attacking five divisions of Grant's army and forcing a confused retreat toward the Tennessee River. Johnston was killed and command fell upon Beauregard. One Union line held the Confederate attack off for several hours, giving Grant time to assemble artillery and 20,000 troops near Pittsburg Landing. The Confederates finally broke and captured a Union division, but Grant's newly assembled line held the landing, while the exhausted Confederates, lacking reinforcements, halted their advance. (Note: The April 6 fighting had been costly, with thousands of casualties. That evening, heavy rain set in. Sherman found Grant standing alone under a tree in the rain. "Well, Grant, we've had the devil's own day of it, haven't we?" Sherman said. "Yes," replied Grant. "Lick 'em tomorrow, though.")

Bolstered by 18,000 troops from the divisions of Major Generals Buell and Lew Wallace, Grant counterattacked at dawn the next day and regained the field, forcing the disorganized and demoralized rebels to retreat to Corinth. Halleck ordered Grant not to advance more than one day's march from Pittsburg Landing, stopping the pursuit. Although Grant had won the battle, the situation was little changed. Grant, now realizing that the South was determined to fight, would later write, "Then, indeed, I gave up all idea of saving the Union except by complete conquest."

Shiloh was the costliest battle in American history to that point and the staggering 23,746 casualties stunned the nation. Briefly hailed a hero for routing the Confederates, Grant was soon mired in controversy. The Northern press castigated Grant for shockingly high casualties, and accused him of drunkenness during the battle, contrary to the accounts of those with him at the time. Discouraged, Grant considered resigning but Sherman convinced him to stay. Lincoln dismissed Grant's critics, saying "I can't spare this man; he fights." Grant's costly victory at Shiloh ended any chance for the Confederates to prevail in the Mississippi valley or regain its strategic advantage in the West.

Halleck arrived from St. Louis on April 11, took command, and assembled a combined army of about 120,000 men. On April 29, he relieved Grant of field command and replaced him with Major General George Henry Thomas. Halleck slowly marched his army to take Corinth, entrenching each night. Meanwhile, Beauregard pretended to be reinforcing, sent "deserters" to the Union Army with that story, and moved his army out during the night, to Halleck's surprise when he finally arrived at Corinth on May 30.

Halleck divided his combined army and reinstated Grant as field commander on July 11. Later that year, on September 19, Grant's army defeated Confederates at the Battle of Iuka, then successfully defended Corinth, inflicting heavy casualties. On October 25, Grant assumed command of the District of the Tennessee. In November, after Lincoln's preliminary Emancipation Proclamation, Grant ordered units under his command to incorporate former slaves into the Union Army, giving them clothes, shelter, and wages for their services.

=== Vicksburg campaign (1862–1863) ===
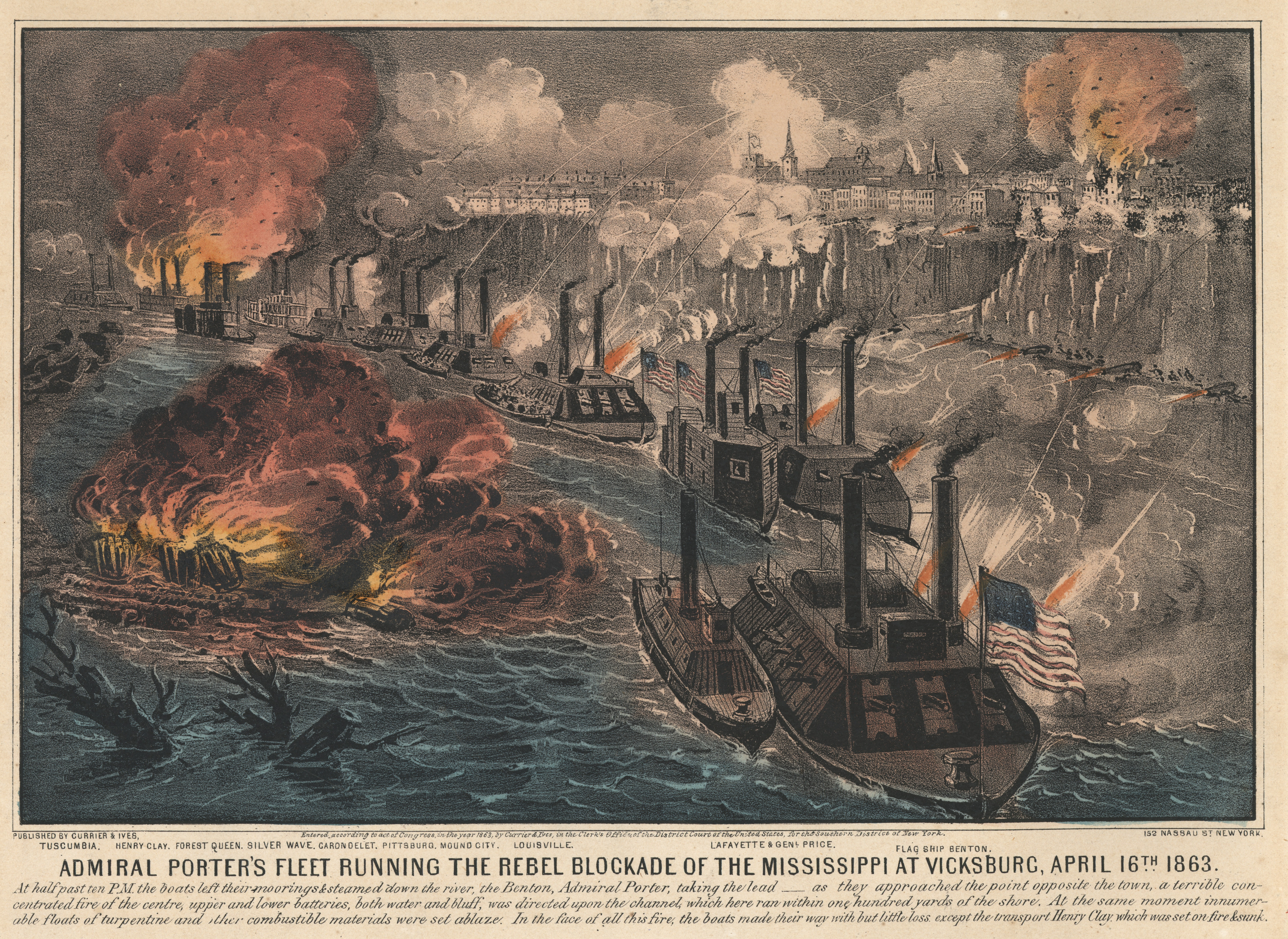
Grant's successful gamble: Porter's gunboats night ran the Confederate gauntlet at Vicksburg on the Mississippi River.

The Union capture of Vicksburg, the last Confederate stronghold on the Mississippi River, was considered vital as it would split the Confederacy in two. Lincoln appointed McClernand for the job, rather than Grant or Sherman. Halleck, who retained power over troop displacement, ordered McClernand to Memphis, and placed him and his troops under Grant's authority.

On November 13, 1862, Grant captured Holly Springs and advanced to Corinth. His plan was to attack Vicksburg overland, while Sherman would attack Vicksburg from Chickasaw Bayou. However, Confederate cavalry raids on December 11 and 20 broke Union communications and recaptured Holly Springs, preventing Grant and Sherman from converging on Vicksburg. The most significant of these raids was led by Confederate General Earl Van Dorn, whose successful surprise attack at Holly Springs on December 20, 1862, destroyed Grant's supply base and forced him to abandon his overland advance on Vicksburg. McClernand reached Sherman's army, assumed command, and independently of Grant led a campaign that captured Confederate Fort Hindman. After the sack of Holly Springs, Grant considered and sometimes adopted the strategy of foraging the land, rather than exposing long Union supply lines to enemy attack.

Fugitive African-American slaves poured into Grant's district, whom he sent north to Cairo to be domestic servants in Chicago. However, Lincoln ended this when Illinois political leaders complained. On his own initiative, Grant set up a pragmatic program and hired Presbyterian chaplain John Eaton to administer contraband camps. Freed slaves picked cotton that was shipped north to aid the Union war effort. Lincoln approved and Grant's program was successful. Grant also worked freed black labor on a canal to bypass Vicksburg, incorporating the laborers into the Union Army and Navy.

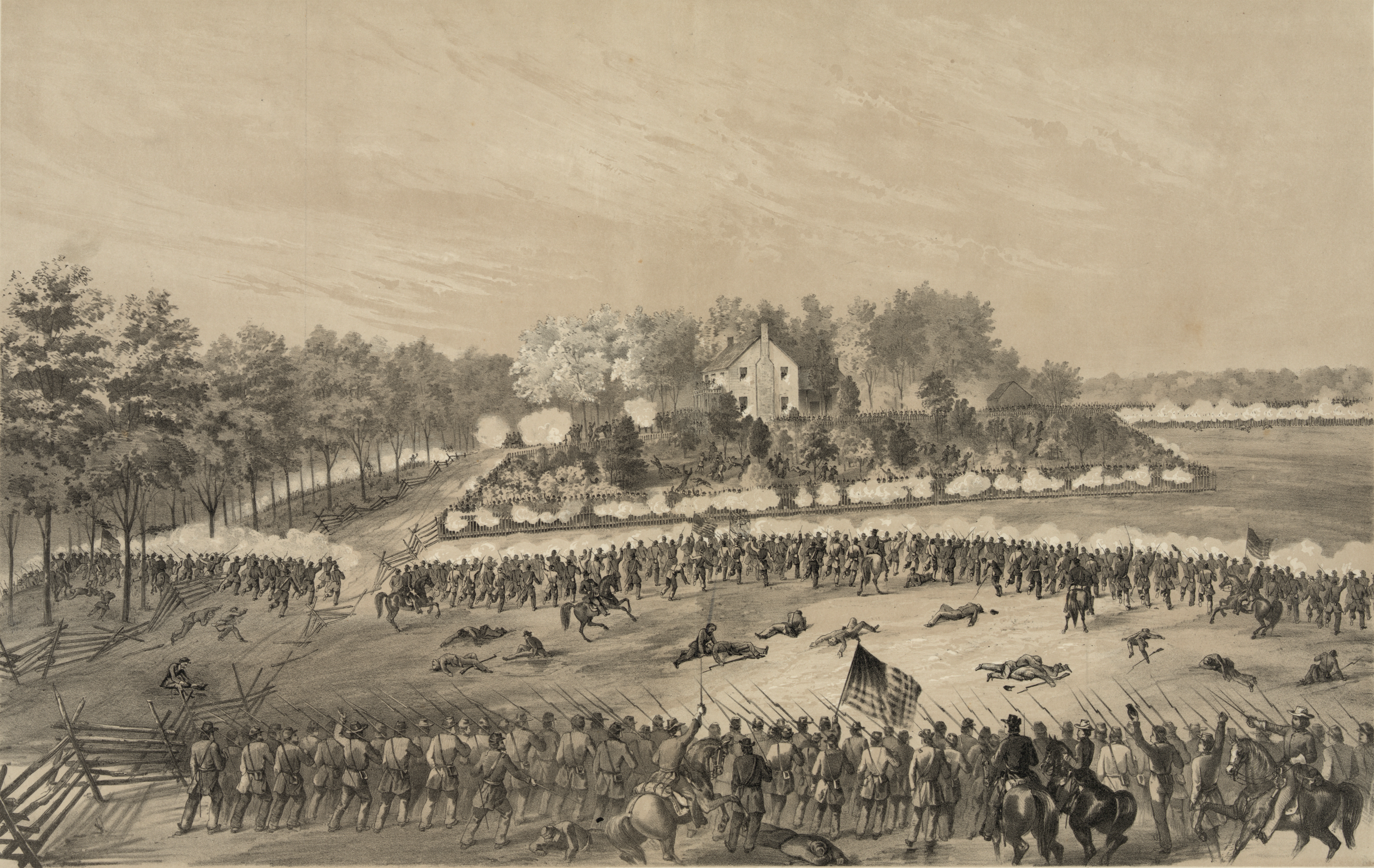
The Battle of Jackson, fought on May 14, 1863, was part of the Vicksburg campaign.

Grant's war responsibilities included combating illegal Northern cotton trade and civilian obstruction. (Note: Smuggling of cotton was rampant, while the price of cotton skyrocketed. Grant believed the smuggling funded the Confederacy and provided them with military intelligence.) He had received numerous complaints about Jewish speculators in his district. The majority, however, of those involved in illegal trading were not Jewish. To help combat this, Grant required two permits, one from the Treasury and one from the Union Army, to purchase cotton. On December 17, 1862, Grant issued a controversial General Order No. 11, expelling "Jews, as a class", from his military district. After complaints, Lincoln rescinded the order on January 3, 1863. Grant finally ended the order on January 17. He later described issuing the order as one of his biggest regrets. (Note: In 2012, historian Jonathan D. Sarna said: "Gen. Ulysses S. Grant issued the most notorious anti-Jewish official order in American history." Grant made amends with the Jewish community during his presidency, appointing them to various federal positions. In 2017, biographer Ron Chernow said of Grant: "As we shall see, Grant as president atoned for his action in a multitude of meaningful ways. He was never a bigoted, hate-filled man and was haunted by his terrible action for the rest of his days.")

On January 29, 1863, Grant assumed overall command. To bypass Vicksburg's guns, Grant slowly advanced his Union army south through water-logged terrain. The plan of attacking Vicksburg from downriver was risky because, east of the river, his army would be distanced from most of its supply lines, and would have to rely on foraging. On April 16, Grant ordered Admiral David Dixon Porter's gunboats south under fire from the Vicksburg batteries to meet up with troops who had marched south down the west side of the river. Grant ordered diversionary battles, confusing Confederate commander General John C. Pemberton and allowing Grant's army to move east across the Mississippi. Grant's army captured Jackson. Advancing west, he defeated Pemberton's army at the Battle of Champion Hill on May 16, forcing their retreat into Vicksburg.

After Grant's men assaulted the entrenchments twice, suffering severe losses, they settled in for a siege which lasted seven weeks. During quiet periods of the campaign, Grant would drink on occasion. The personal rivalry between McClernand and Grant continued until Grant removed him from command when he contravened Grant by publishing an order without permission. Pemberton surrendered Vicksburg to Grant on July 4, 1863.

Vicksburg's fall gave Union forces control of the Mississippi River and split the Confederacy. By that time, Grant's political sympathies fully coincided with the Radical Republicans' aggressive prosecution of the war and emancipation of the slaves. The success at Vicksburg was a morale boost for the Union war effort. When Stanton suggested Grant be brought east to run the Army of the Potomac, Grant demurred, writing that he knew the geography and resources of the West better and he did not want to upset the chain of command in the East.

=== Chattanooga (1863) and promotion ===
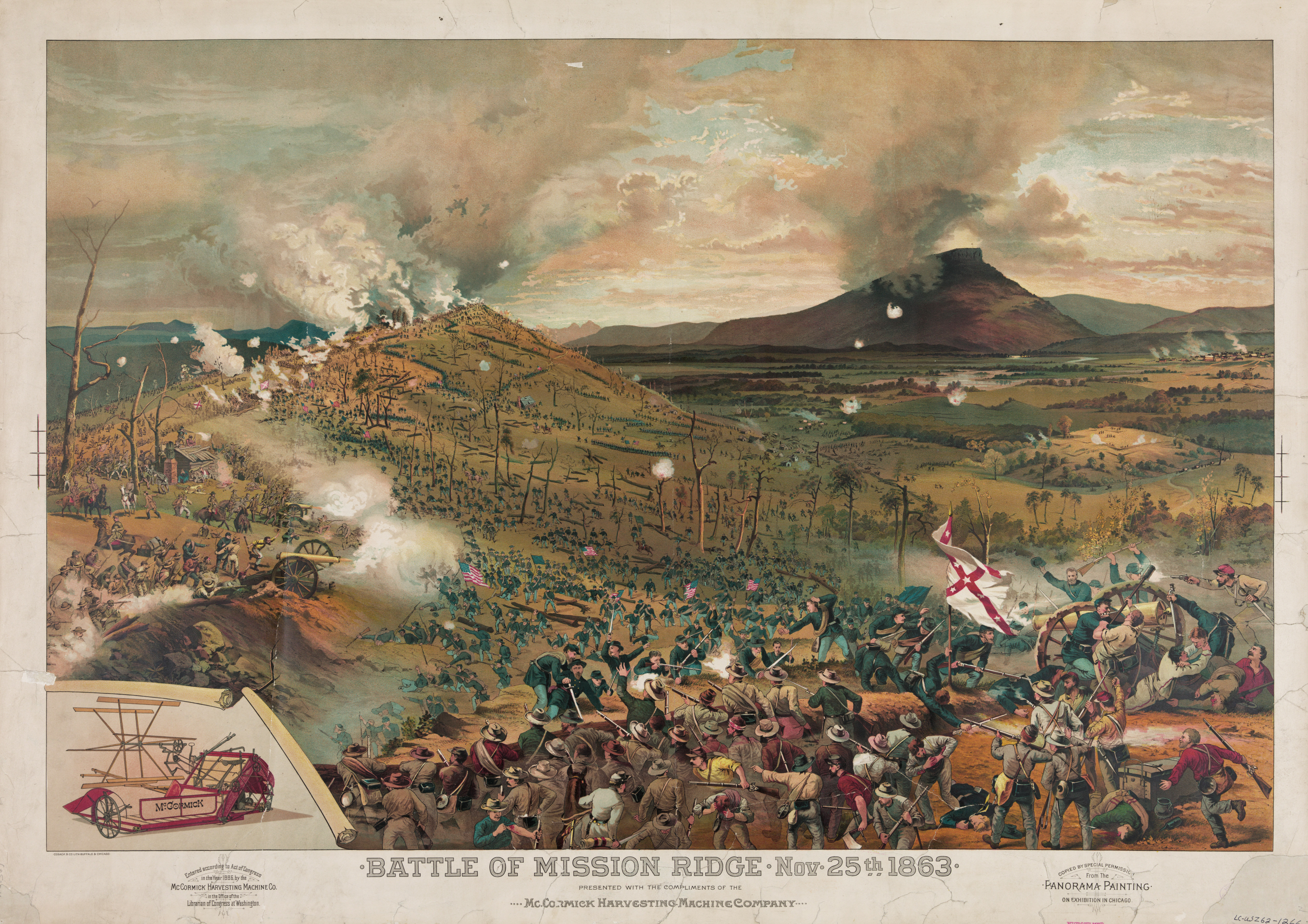
Union troops swarm Missionary Ridge and defeat Bragg's army.

On October 16, 1863, Grant was assigned to take command of the newly formed Division of the Mississippi, which comprised the Armies of the Ohio, the Tennessee, and the Cumberland. After the Battle of Chickamauga, the Army of the Cumberland retreated into Chattanooga, where they were partially besieged. Grant arrived in Chattanooga, where plans to resupply and break the partial siege had already been set. Forces commanded by Major General Joseph Hooker, which had been sent from the Army of the Potomac, approached from the west and linked up with other units moving east from inside the city, capturing Brown's Ferry and opening a supply line to the railroad at Bridgeport.

Grant planned to have Sherman's Army of the Tennessee, assisted by the Army of the Cumberland, assault the northern end of Missionary Ridge and roll down it on the enemy's right flank. On November 23, Major General George Henry Thomas surprised the enemy in open daylight, advancing the Union lines and taking Orchard Knob, between Chattanooga and the ridge. The next day, Sherman failed to get atop Missionary Ridge, which was key to Grant's plan of battle. Hooker's forces took Lookout Mountain in unexpected success. On the 25th, Grant ordered Thomas to advance to the rifle-pits at the base of Missionary Ridge after Sherman's army failed to take Missionary Ridge from the northeast. Four divisions of the Army of the Cumberland, with the center two led by Major General Philip Sheridan and Brigadier General Thomas J. Wood, chased the Confederates out of the rifle-pits at the base and, against orders, continued the charge up the 45-degree slope and captured the Confederate entrenchments along the crest, forcing a hurried retreat. The decisive battle gave the Union control of Tennessee and opened Georgia, the Confederate heartland, to Union invasion.

On March 2, 1864, Lincoln promoted Grant to lieutenant general, giving him command of all Union Armies. Grant's new rank had previously been held only by George Washington. Grant arrived in Washington on March 8 and was formally commissioned by Lincoln the next day at a Cabinet meeting. Grant developed a good working relationship with Lincoln, who allowed Grant to devise his own strategy.

Grant established his headquarters with General George Meade's Army of the Potomac in Culpeper, Virginia, and met weekly with Lincoln and Stanton in Washington. After protest from Halleck, Grant scrapped a risky invasion of North Carolina and planned five coordinated Union offensives to prevent Confederate armies from shifting troops along interior lines. Grant and Meade would make a direct frontal attack on Robert E. Lee's Army of Northern Virginia, while Sherman—now in command of all western armies—would destroy Joseph E. Johnston's Army of Tennessee and take Atlanta. Major General Benjamin Butler would advance on Lee from the southeast, up the James River, while Major General Nathaniel Banks would capture Mobile. Major General Franz Sigel was to capture granaries and rail lines in the fertile Shenandoah Valley. Grant now commanded 533,000 battle-ready troops spread out over an eighteen-mile front.

=== Overland Campaign (1864) ===
The Overland Campaign was a series of brutal battles fought in Virginia during May and June 1864. Sigel's and Butler's efforts failed, and Grant was left alone to fight Lee. On May 4, Grant led the army from his headquarters towards Germanna Ford. They crossed the Rapidan unopposed. On May 5, the Union army attacked Lee in the battle of the Wilderness, a three-day battle with estimated casualties of 17,666 Union and 11,125 Confederate.

Rather than retreat, Grant flanked Lee's army to the southeast and attempted to wedge his forces between Lee and Richmond at Spotsylvania Court House. Lee's army got to Spotsylvania first and a costly battle ensued, lasting thirteen days, with heavy casualties. On May 12, Grant attempted to break through Lee's Muleshoe salient guarded by Confederate artillery, resulting in one of the bloodiest assaults of the Civil War, known as the Bloody Angle. Unable to break Lee's lines, Grant again flanked the rebels to the southeast, meeting at North Anna, where a battle lasted three days.

==== Cold Harbor ====
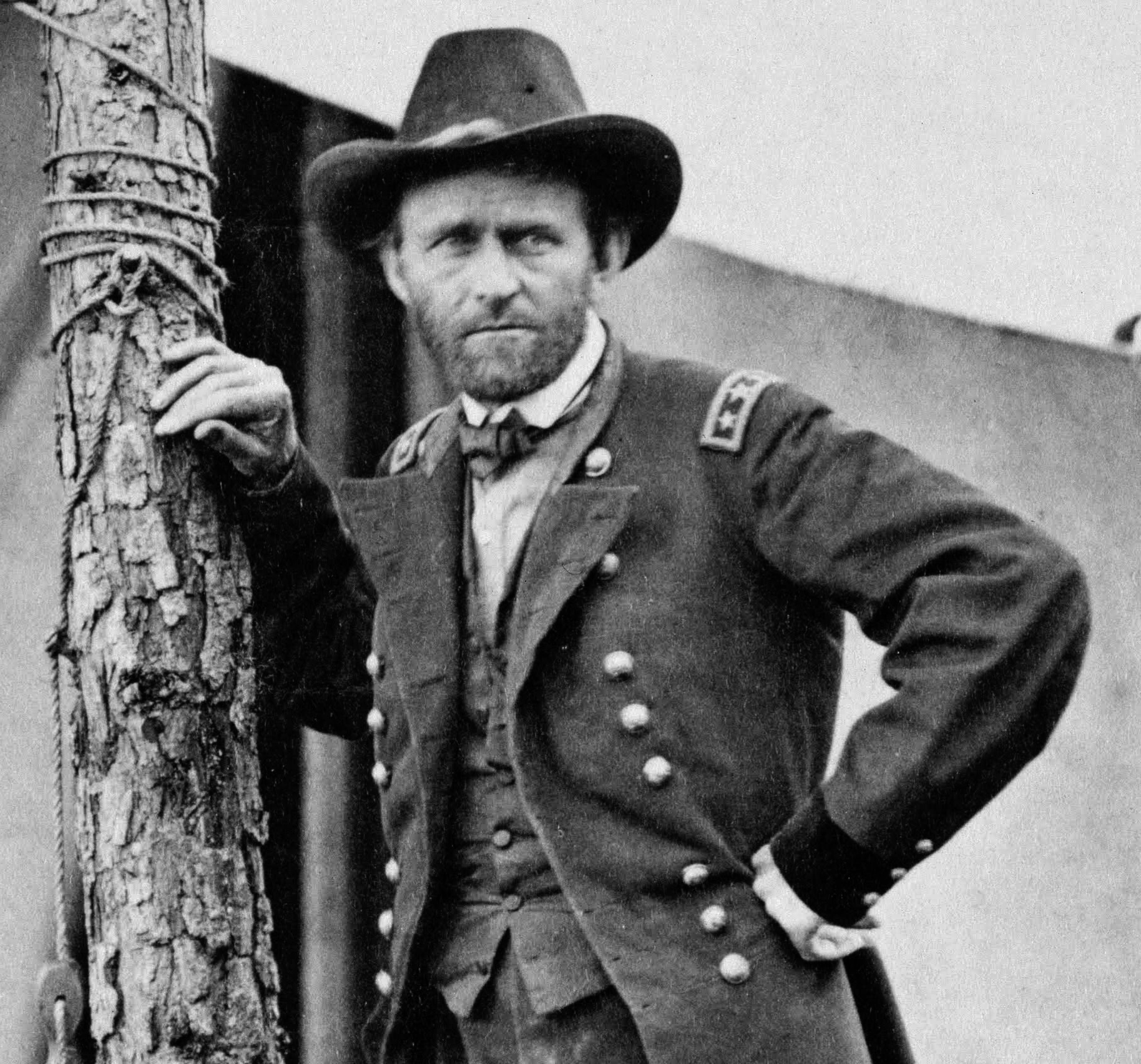
General Grant at his headquarters in Cold Harbor, Virginia, June 1864

The then-recent bloody Wilderness campaign had severely diminished Confederate morale; Grant believed breaking through Lee's lines at its weakest point, Cold Harbor, a vital road hub that linked to Richmond, would mean a quick end to the war. Grant already had two corps in position at Cold Harbor with Hancock's corps on the way.

Lee's lines were extended north and east of Richmond and Petersburg for approximately ten miles, but at several points there were no fortifications built yet, including Cold Harbor. On June 1 and 2 both Grant and Lee were waiting for reinforcements to arrive. Hancock's men had marched all night and arrived too exhausted for an immediate attack that morning. Grant postponed the attack until 5 p.m., and then again until 4:30 a.m. on June 3. However, Grant and Meade did not give specific orders for the attack, leaving it up to the corps commanders to coordinate. Grant had not yet learned that overnight Lee had hastily constructed entrenchments to thwart any breach attempt at Cold Harbor. Grant was anxious to make his move before the rest of Lee's army arrived. On the morning of June 3, with a force of more than 100,000 men, against Lee's 59,000, Grant attacked, not realizing that Lee's army was now well entrenched, much of it obscured by trees and bushes. Grant's army suffered 12,000–14,000 casualties, while Lee's army suffered 3,000–5,000 casualties, but Lee was less able to replace them.

The unprecedented number of casualties heightened anti-war sentiment in the North. After the battle, Grant wanted to appeal to Lee under the white flag for each side to gather up their wounded, most of them Union soldiers, but Lee insisted that a total truce be enacted and while they were deliberating all but a few of the wounded died in the field. Without giving an apology for the disastrous defeat in his official military report, Grant confided in his staff after the battle and years later wrote in his memoirs that he "regretted that the last assault at Cold Harbor was ever made."

=== Siege of Petersburg (1864–1865) ===
Undetected by Lee, Grant moved his army south of the James River, freed Butler from the Bermuda Hundred, and advanced toward Petersburg, Virginia's central railroad hub, resulting in a nine-month siege. Northern resentment grew. Sheridan was assigned command of the Union Army of the Shenandoah and Grant directed him to "follow the enemy to their death" in the Shenandoah Valley. After Grant's abortive attempt to capture Petersburg, Lincoln supported Grant in his decision to continue.

Grant had to commit troops to check Confederate General Jubal Early's raids in the Shenandoah Valley, which were getting dangerously close to Washington. By late July, at Petersburg, Grant reluctantly approved a plan to blow up part of the enemy trenches from a tunnel filled with gunpowder. The massive explosion instantly killed an entire Confederate regiment. The poorly led Union troops under Major General Ambrose Burnside and Brigadier General James H. Ledlie, rather than encircling the crater, rushed into it. Recovering from the surprise, Confederates, led by Major General William Mahone, surrounded the crater and easily picked off Union troops. The Union's 3,500 casualties outnumbered the Confederates' three-to-one. The battle marked the first time that Union black troops, who endured a large proportion of the casualties, engaged in any major battle in the east. Grant admitted that the tactic had been a "stupendous failure".

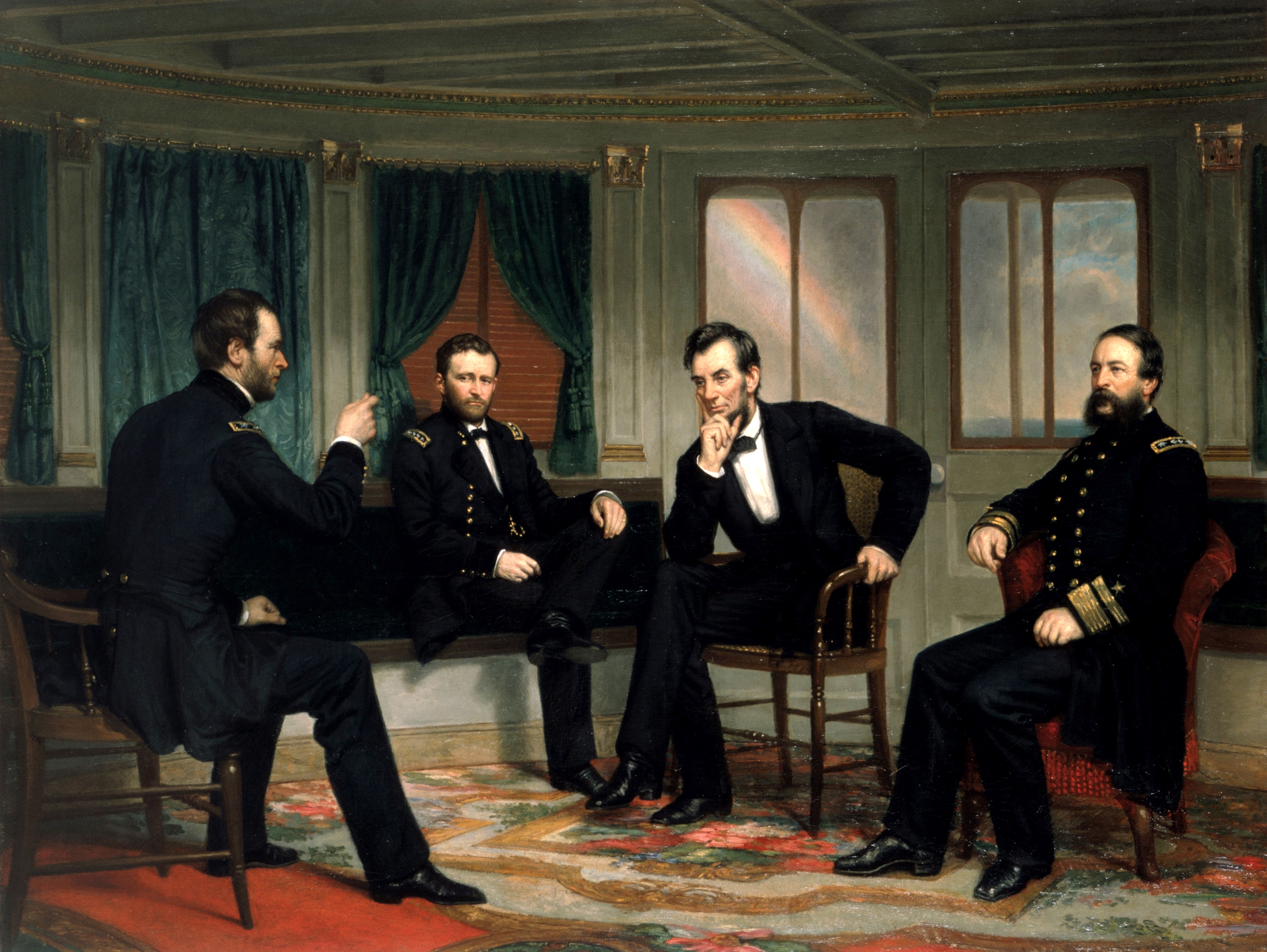
Grant (center left) next to Lincoln with General Sherman (far left) and Admiral Porter (right) – The Peacemakers by George Peter Alexander Healy, 1868

Grant would later meet with Lincoln and testify at a court of inquiry against Generals Burnside and Ledlie for their incompetence. In his memoirs, he blamed them for that disastrous Union defeat. Rather than fight Lee in a full-frontal attack as he had done at Cold Harbor, Grant continued to force Lee to extend his defenses south and west of Petersburg, better allowing him to capture essential railroad links.

Union forces soon captured Mobile Bay and Atlanta and now controlled the Shenandoah Valley, ensuring Lincoln's reelection in November. Sherman convinced Grant and Lincoln to allow his army to march on Savannah. Sherman cut a 60-mile (97 km) path of destruction unopposed, reached the Atlantic Ocean, and captured Savannah on December 22. On December 16, after much prodding by Grant, the Union Army under Thomas smashed John Bell Hood's Confederates at Nashville. These campaigns left Lee's forces at Petersburg as the only significant obstacle remaining to Union victory.

By March 1865, Lee was trapped and his strength severely weakened. He was running out of reserves to replace the high battlefield casualties and remaining Confederate troops, no longer having confidence in their commander and under the duress of trench warfare, deserted by the thousands. On March 25, in a desperate effort, Lee sacrificed his remaining troops (4,000 Confederate casualties) at Fort Stedman, a Union victory and the last Petersburg line battle.

=== Surrender of Lee and Union victory (1865) ===
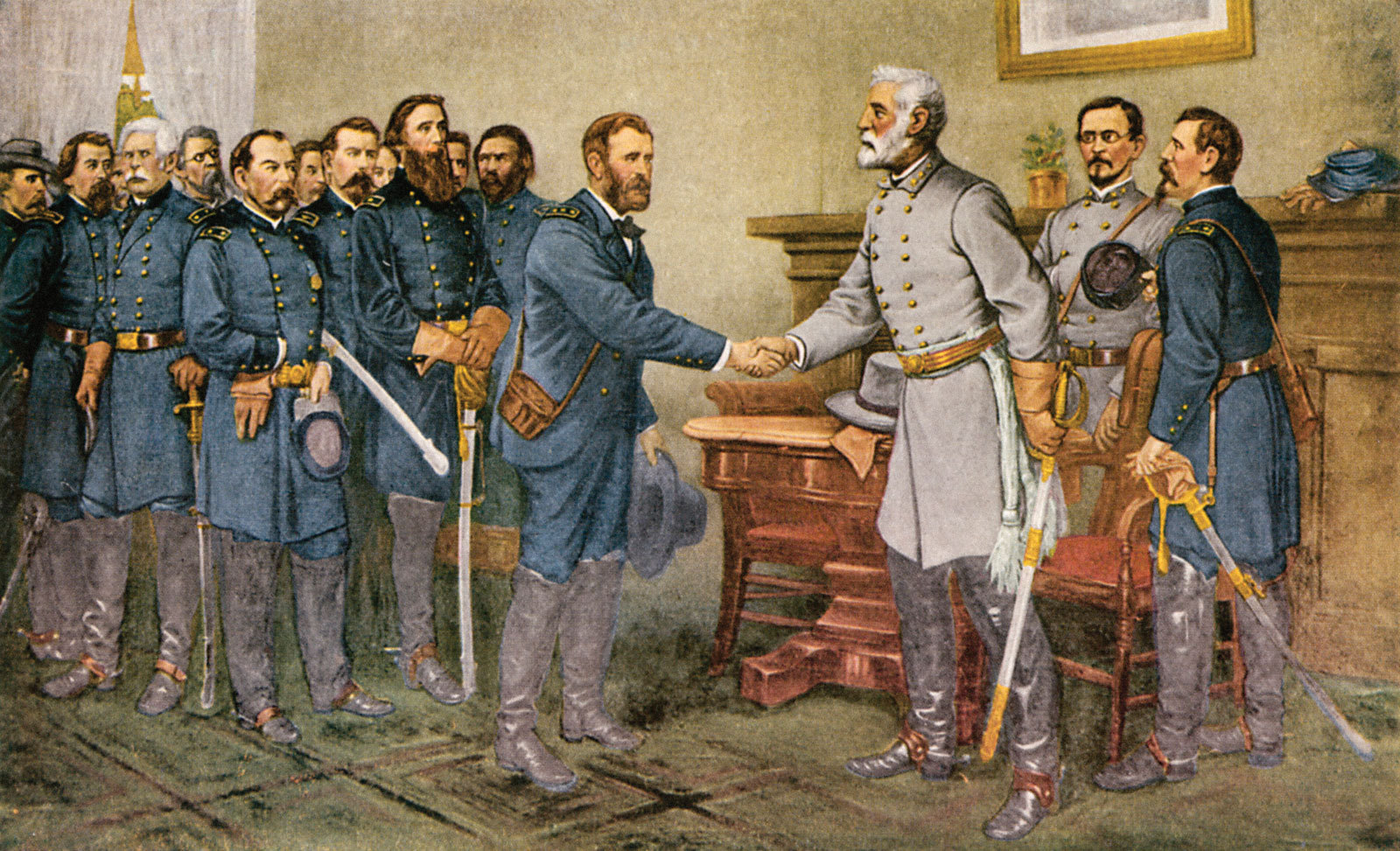
Defeated by Grant, Lee surrendered at Appomattox Court House.

On April 2, Grant ordered a general assault on Lee's forces; Lee abandoned Petersburg and Richmond, which Grant captured. A desperate Lee and part of his army attempted to link up with the remnants of Joseph E. Johnston's army. Sheridan's cavalry stopped the two armies from converging, cutting them off from their supply trains. Grant sent his aide Orville Babcock to carry his last dispatch to Lee demanding his surrender. Grant immediately rode west, bypassing Lee's army, to join Sheridan who had captured Appomattox Station, blocking Lee's escape route. On his way, Grant received a letter from Lee stating Lee would surrender his army.

On April 9, Grant and Lee met at Appomattox Court House. Although Grant felt depressed at the fall of "a foe who had fought so long and valiantly," he believed the Southern cause was "one of the worst for which a people ever fought." Grant wrote out the terms of surrender: "each officer and man will be allowed to return to his home, not to be disturbed by U.S. authority so long as they observe their paroles and the laws in force where they may reside." Lee immediately accepted Grant's terms and signed the surrender document, without any diplomatic recognition of the Confederacy. Lee asked that his former Confederate troops keep their horses, which Grant generously allowed. Grant ordered his troops to stop all celebration, saying the "war is over; the rebels are our countrymen again." Johnston's Tennessee army surrendered on April 26, 1865, Richard Taylor's Alabama army on May 4, and Kirby Smith's Texas army on May 26, ending the war.

=== Lincoln's assassination ===
On April 14, 1865, Grant attended a cabinet meeting in Washington. Lincoln invited him and his wife Julia to Ford's Theatre but they declined, because they planned to travel to their home in Burlington. In a conspiracy that also targeted top cabinet members in one last effort to topple the Union, Lincoln was shot by John Wilkes Booth at the theater and died the next morning. Many, including Grant himself, thought that Grant had been a target in the plot. During the subsequent trial, the government tried to prove that Grant had been stalked by Booth's conspirator Michael O'Laughlen. Stanton notified Grant of the president's death and summoned him to Washington. Vice President Andrew Johnson was sworn in as president on April 15. (Note: Attending Lincoln's funeral on April 19, Grant stood alone and wept openly; he later said Lincoln was "the greatest man I have ever known".) Grant was determined to work with Johnson, and he privately expressed "every reason to hope" in the new president's ability to run the government "in its old channel".

== Commanding generalship (1865–1869) ==
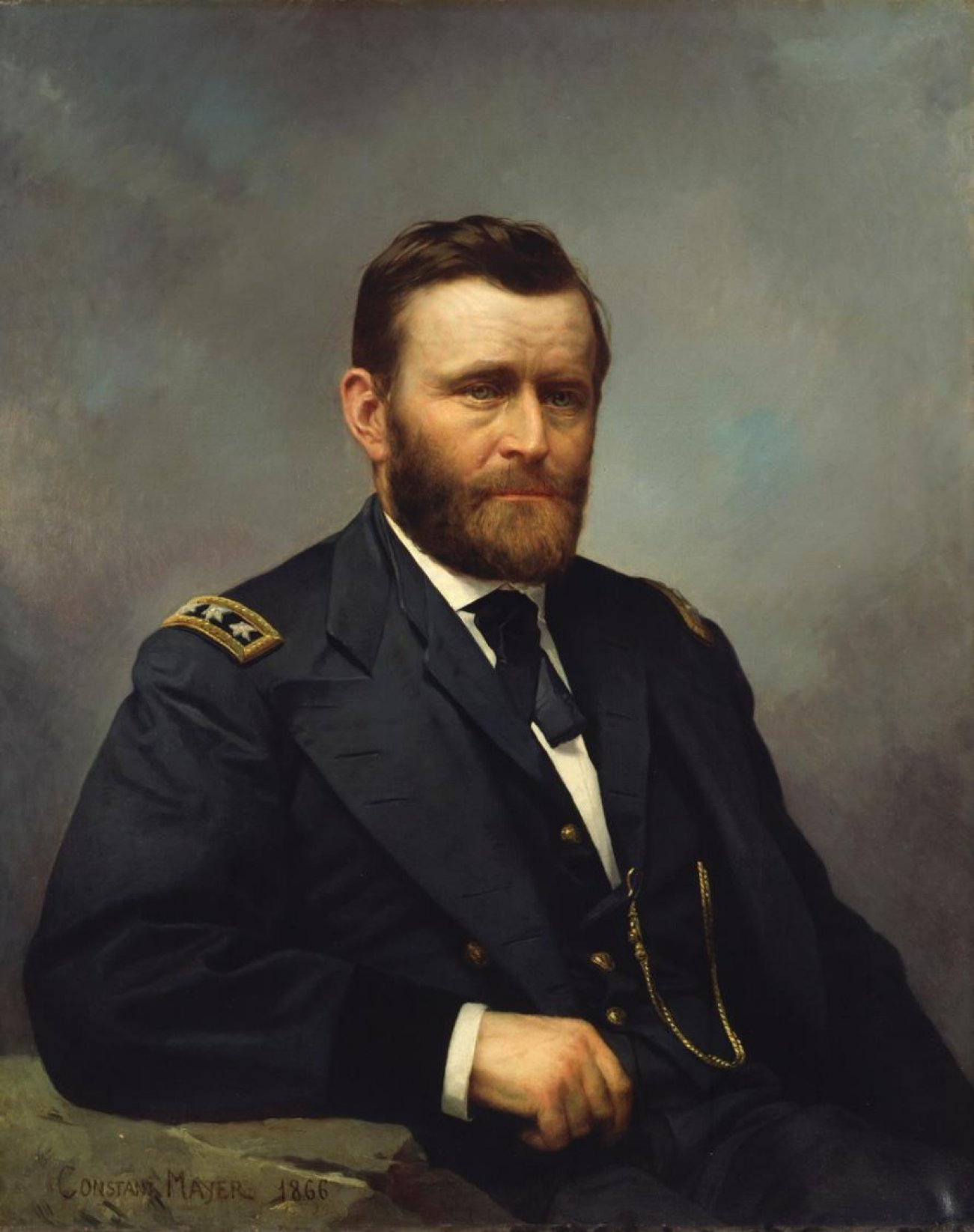
Constant Mayer's portrait of General Grant, 1866

At the war's end, Grant remained commander of the army, with duties that included dealing with Emperor Maximilian and French troops in Mexico, enforcement of Reconstruction in the former Confederate states, and supervision of Indian wars on the western Plains. After the Grand Review of the Armies, Lee and his generals were indicted for treason in Virginia. Johnson demanded they be put on trial, but Grant insisted that they should not be tried, citing his Appomattox amnesty. Charges against Lee were dropped. Grant secured a house for his family in Georgetown Heights in 1865 but instructed Elihu Washburne that for political purposes his legal residence remained in Galena, Illinois. On July 25, 1866, Congress promoted Grant to the newly created rank of General of the Army of the United States.

=== Tour of the South ===
President Johnson's Reconstruction policy included a speedy return of the former Confederates to Congress, reinstating white people to office in the South, and relegating black people to second-class citizenship. On November 27, 1865, Grant was sent by Johnson on a fact-finding mission to the South, to counter a pending less favorable report by Senator Carl Schurz which reported that white people in the South harbored resentment of the North, and that black people suffered from violence and fraud. Grant recommended continuation of the Freedmen's Bureau, which Johnson opposed, but advised against using black troops.

Grant believed the people of the South were not ready for self-rule and required federal government protection. Concerned that the war led to diminished respect for civil authorities, he continued using the Army to maintain order. Grant's report on the South, which he later recanted, sympathized with Johnson's Reconstruction policies. Although Grant desired former Confederates be returned to Congress, he advocated eventual black citizenship. On December 19, the day after the passage of the Thirteenth Amendment was announced in the Senate, Johnson's response used Grant's report, read aloud to the Senate, to undermine Schurz's final report and Radical opposition to Johnson's policies.

=== Break from Johnson ===
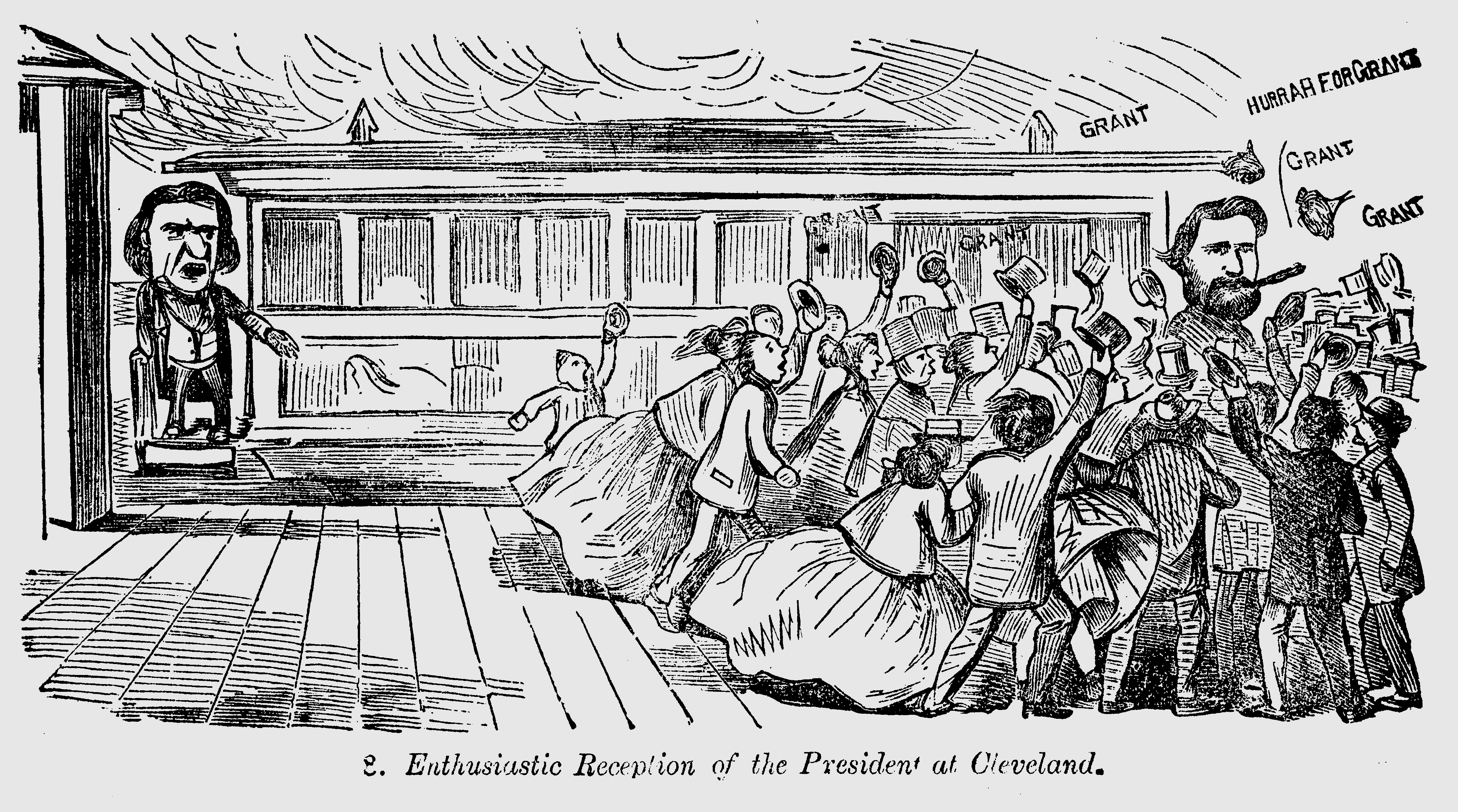
Cartoon illustration from Swingin' Round the Cirkle, or Andy's trip to the West by David Ross Locke, suggesting that Grant was a bigger draw on the multi-city tour than was Johnson

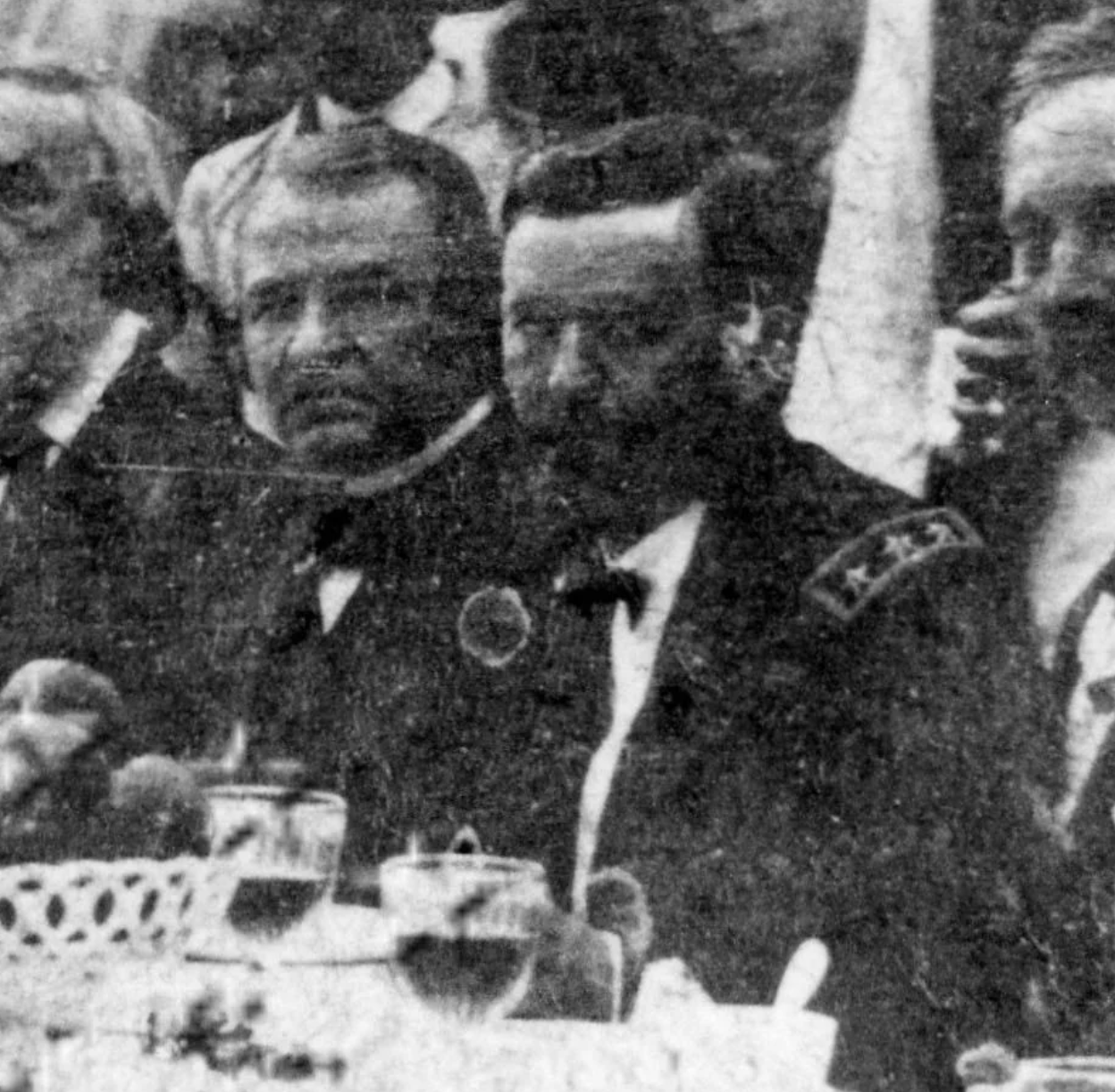
Andrew Johnson and Ulysses Grant pictured during Johnson's Swing Around the Circle tour (1866)

Grant was initially optimistic about Johnson. Despite differing styles, the two got along cordially and Grant attended cabinet meetings concerning Reconstruction. By February 1866, the relationship began to break down. Johnson opposed Grant's closure of the Richmond Examiner for disloyal editorials and his enforcement of the Civil Rights Act of 1866, passed over Johnson's veto. Needing Grant's popularity, Johnson took Grant on his "Swing Around the Circle" tour, a failed attempt to gain national support for lenient policies toward the South. Grant privately called Johnson's speeches a "national disgrace" and he left the tour early. On March 2, 1867, overriding Johnson's veto, Congress passed the first of three Reconstruction Acts, using military officers to enforce the policy. Protecting Grant, Congress passed the Command of the Army Act, preventing his removal or relocation, and forcing Johnson to pass orders through Grant.

In August 1867, bypassing the Tenure of Office Act, Johnson discharged Secretary of War Edwin Stanton without Senate approval and appointed Grant ad interim Secretary of War. Stanton was the only remaining cabinet member friendly to the Radicals. Although Grant initially recommended against dismissing Stanton, he accepted the position, not wanting the Army to fall under a conservative appointee who would impede Reconstruction, and managed an uneasy partnership with Johnson.

In December 1867, Congress voted to keep Stanton, who was reinstated by a Senate Committee on January 10, 1868. Grant told Johnson he was going to resign the office to avoid fines and imprisonment. Johnson, who believed the law would be overturned, said he would assume Grant's legal responsibility, and reminded Grant that he had promised to delay his resignation until a suitable replacement was found. The following Monday, not willing to wait for the law to be overturned, Grant surrendered the office to Stanton, causing confusion with Johnson. With the backing of his cabinet, Johnson accused Grant of lying and "duplicity" at a stormy cabinet meeting, while a shocked and disappointed Grant felt it was Johnson who was lying. The publication of angry messages between Grant and Johnson led to a complete break between them. The controversy led to Johnson's impeachment and trial in the Senate; he was acquitted by one vote. Grant's popularity rose among the Radical Republicans and his nomination for the presidency appeared certain.

=== Election of 1868 ===
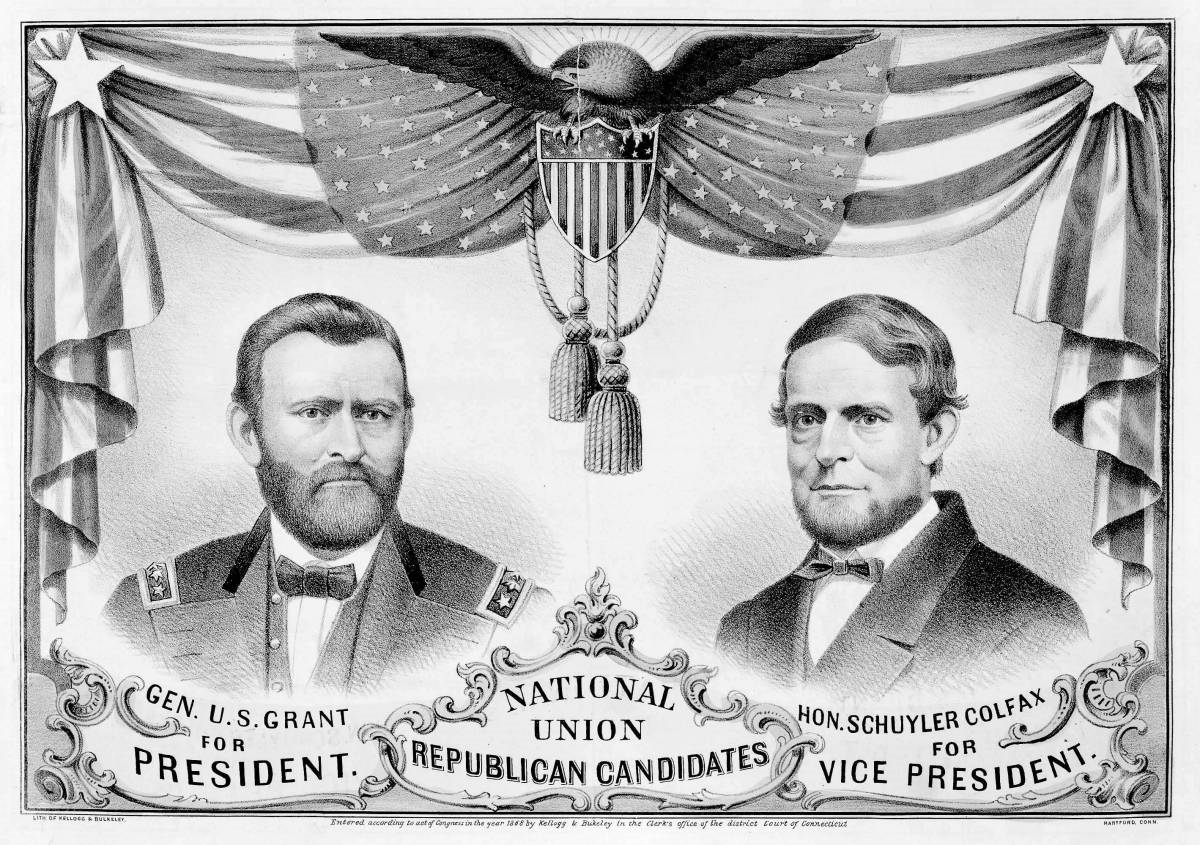
Grant–Colfax Republican ticket

At the 1868 Republican National Convention, the delegates unanimously nominated Grant for president on the first ballot and Speaker of the House Schuyler Colfax for vice president on the fifth. Although Grant had preferred to remain in the army, he accepted the Republican nomination, believing that he was the only one who could unify the nation. The Republicans advocated "equal civil and political rights to all" and African American enfranchisement. The Democrats, having abandoned Johnson, nominated former governor Horatio Seymour of New York for president and Francis Preston Blair Jr. of Missouri for vice president. The Democrats opposed suffrage for African Americans and advocated the immediate restoration of former Confederate states to the Union and amnesty from "all past political offenses".

Grant played no overt role during the campaign and was joined by Sherman and Sheridan in a tour of the West that summer. However, the Republicans adopted his words "Let us have peace" as their campaign slogan. Grant's 1862 General Order No. 11 became an issue during the presidential campaign; he sought to distance himself from the order, saying "I have no prejudice against sect or race, but want each individual to be judged by his own merit." The Democrats and their Klan supporters focused mainly on ending Reconstruction, intimidating black people and Republicans, and returning control of the South to the white Democrats and the planter class, alienating War Democrats in the North. Grant won the popular vote and an Electoral College landslide of 214 votes to Seymour's 80. Seymour received a majority of white voters, but Grant was aided by 500,000 votes cast by black people, winning him 52.7 percent of the popular vote. He lost Louisiana and Georgia, primarily due to Ku Klux Klan violence against African-American voters. At the age of 46, Grant was the youngest president yet elected.

== Presidency (1869–1877) ==
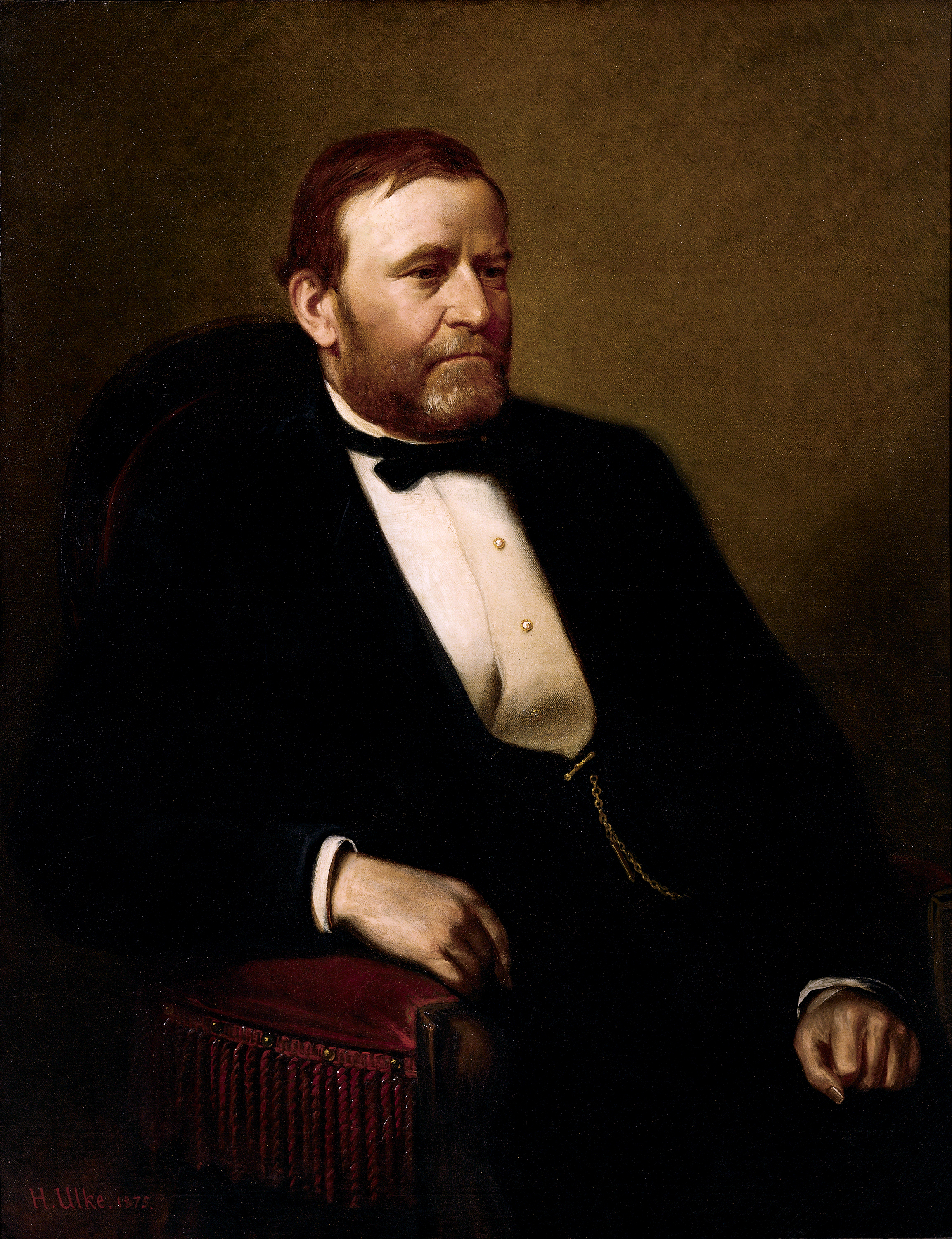
Official White House portrait of President Grant by Henry Ulke, 1875

On March 4, 1869, Grant was sworn in as president by Chief Justice Salmon P. Chase. In his inaugural address, Grant urged the ratification of the Fifteenth Amendment; many African Americans attended his inauguration. He urged that bonds issued during the Civil War should be paid in gold, called for "proper treatment" of Native Americans and encouraged their "civilization and ultimate citizenship".

Grant's cabinet appointments sparked both criticism and approval. He appointed Elihu B. Washburne Secretary of State and John A. Rawlins Secretary of War. Washburne resigned, and Grant appointed him Minister to France. Grant then appointed former New York Senator Hamilton Fish Secretary of State. Rawlins died in office, and Grant appointed William W. Belknap Secretary of War. Grant appointed New York businessman Alexander T. Stewart Secretary of the Treasury, but Stewart was found legally ineligible by a 1789 law disallowing any importer of goods from holding the position. Grant then appointed Massachusetts Representative George S. Boutwell Secretary of the Treasury. Philadelphia businessman Adolph E. Borie was appointed Secretary of the Navy, but found the job stressful and resigned. Grant then appointed New Jersey's attorney general, George M. Robeson, Secretary of the Navy. Former Ohio Governor Jacob D. Cox (Interior), former Maryland Senator John Creswell (Postmaster-General), and Ebenezer Rockwood Hoar (Attorney General) rounded out the cabinet.

Grant nominated Sherman to succeed him as general-in-chief and gave him control over war bureau chiefs. When Rawlins took over the War Department he complained that Sherman was given too much authority. Grant reluctantly revoked his order, upsetting Sherman and damaging their friendship. James Longstreet, a former Confederate general, was nominated for Surveyor of Customs of New Orleans; this was met with amazement, and seen as a genuine effort to unite the North and South. In March 1872, Grant signed legislation that established Yellowstone National Park, the first national park. Grant was sympathetic to women's rights, including suffrage, saying he wanted "equal rights to all citizens".

To make up for his infamous General Order No. 11, Grant appointed more than fifty Jewish people to federal office, including consuls, district attorneys, and deputy postmasters. He appointed Edward S. Salomon territorial governor of Washington, the first time an American Jewish man occupied a governor's seat. In November 1869, reports surfaced of Alexander II of Russia penalizing 2,000 Jewish families for smuggling by expelling them to the interior of the country. In response, Grant publicly supported the Jewish American B'nai B'rith petition against Alexander. In 1875, Grant proposed a constitutional amendment that limited religious indoctrination in public schools. Schools would be for all children "irrespective of sex, color, birthplace, or religions". Grant's views were incorporated into the Blaine Amendment, but it was defeated by the Senate.

In October 1871, under the Morrill Act, using federal marshals, Grant prosecuted hundreds of Utah Territory Mormon polygamists. Grant called polygamy a "crime against decency and morality". In 1874, Grant signed into law the Poland Act, which made Mormon polygamists subject to trial in District Courts and limited Mormons on juries.

Beginning in March 1873, under the Comstock Act, Grant prosecuted pornographers, in addition to abortionists. To administer the prosecutions, Grant put in charge a vigorous anti-vice activist and reformer, Anthony Comstock. Comstock headed a federal commission and was empowered to destroy obscene material and hand out arrest warrants to offenders.

In September 1875, amidst pervading anti-Catholic sentiment within the Republican Party after its political losses in 1874, Grant gave a speech in Iowa before a reunion of veterans from the Army of the Tennessee in which he opposed appropriations for "the support of any sectarian school"; the word "sectarian" was understood to mean Catholic. Within the same speech, he surmised that the Protestant-Catholic divide will be the source of potential national conflicts after the Civil War: "I predict the dividing line will not be Mason and Dixon's but between patriotism and intelligence on the one side, and superstition, ambition and ignorance on the other." The speech later became Grant's most reproduced speech from his presidency.

=== Reconstruction ===
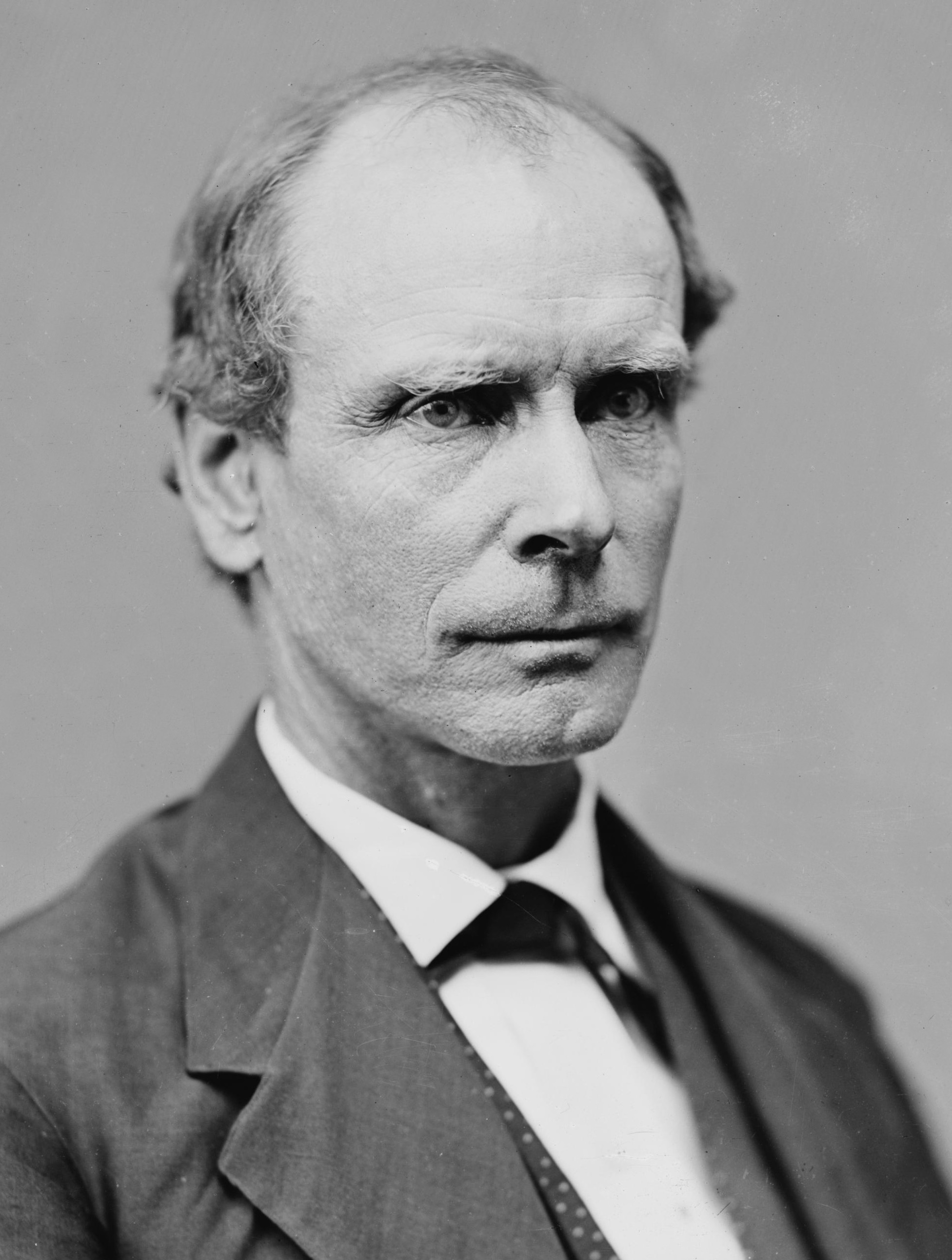
Amos T. Akerman, appointed Attorney General by Grant, who vigorously prosecuted the Ku Klux Klan

Grant was considered an effective civil rights president, concerned about the plight of African Americans. On March 18, 1869, he signed into law equal rights for black people, to serve on juries and hold office, in Washington D.C., and in 1870 he signed the Naturalization Act that gave foreign black people citizenship. During his first term, Reconstruction took precedence. Republicans controlled most Southern states, propped up by Republican-controlled Congress, northern money, and southern military occupation. Grant advocated the ratification of the Fifteenth Amendment that said states could not disenfranchise African Americans. Within a year, the three remaining states—Mississippi, Virginia, and Texas—adopted the new amendment—and were admitted to Congress. Grant put military pressure on Georgia to reinstate its black legislators and adopt the amendment. Georgia complied, and on February 24, 1871, its senators were seated in Congress. With all former Confederate states represented, the Union was completely restored under Grant. (Note: Southern Reconstructed states were controlled locally by Republican carpetbaggers, scalawags and former slaves. By 1877, the conservative Democrats had full control of the region and Reconstruction was dead.) Under Grant, for the first time in history, Black-American men served in the United States Congress, all from the Southern states.

In 1870, to enforce Reconstruction, Congress and Grant created the Justice Department that allowed the Attorney General and the new Solicitor General to prosecute the Klan. Congress and Grant passed three Enforcement Acts, designed to protect black people and Reconstruction governments. Using the Enforcement Acts, Grant crushed the Klan. By October, Grant suspended habeas corpus in part of South Carolina and sent federal troops to help marshals, who initiated prosecutions. Grant's Attorney General, Amos T. Akerman, who replaced Hoar, was zealous to destroy the Klan. Akerman and South Carolina's U.S. marshal arrested over 470 Klan members, while hundreds of Klansmen fled the state. By 1872, the Klan's power had collapsed and African Americans voted in record numbers in the South. (Note: To placate the South in 1870, Grant signed the Amnesty Act, which restored political rights to former Confederates.) Attorney General George H. Williams, Akerman's replacement, suspended prosecutions of the Klan in 1873, but prior to the election of 1874, changed course and prosecuted the Klan. (Note: Additionally, Grant's Postmaster General, John Creswell used his patronage powers to integrate the postal system and appointed a record number of African-American men and women as postal workers across the nation, while also expanding many of the mail routes. Grant appointed Republican abolitionist and champion of black education Hugh Lennox Bond as U.S. Circuit Court judge.)

During Grant's second term, the North retreated from Reconstruction, while southern conservatives called "Redeemers" formed armed groups, the Red Shirts and the White League, who openly used violence, intimidation, voter fraud, and racist appeals to overturn Republican rule. The depressed economy, Grant's scandals, and Northern apathy toward black people made it politically difficult for the administration to maintain support for Reconstruction. Power shifted when the House was taken over by Democrats in the 1874 election. Grant ended the Brooks–Baxter War, bringing Reconstruction in Arkansas to a peaceful conclusion. He sent troops to New Orleans in the wake of the Colfax massacre and disputes over the election of Governor William Pitt Kellogg.

By 1875, Redeemer Democrats had taken control of all but three Southern states. As violence against black Southerners escalated, Grant's Attorney General Edwards Pierrepont told Republican Governor Adelbert Ames of Mississippi that the people were "tired of the autumnal outbreaks in the South", and declined to intervene directly. Grant later regretted not issuing a proclamation to help Ames, having been told Republicans in Ohio would bolt the party if he did. Grant told Congress in January 1875 he could not "see with indifference Union men or Republicans ostracized, persecuted, and murdered." Congress refused to strengthen the laws against violence but instead passed the sweeping Civil Rights Act of 1875 to guarantee black people access to public facilities. However, there was little enforcement and the Supreme Court ruled the law unconstitutional in 1883. In 1876, Grant dispatched troops to South Carolina to keep Republican Governor Daniel Henry Chamberlain in office. After Grant left office, the Compromise of 1877 meant Republicans obtained the White House for Rutherford B. Hayes in return for ending enforcement of racial equality for black people and removing federal troops from the South, marking the end of Reconstruction.

=== Financial affairs ===
Soon after taking office, Grant took conservative steps to return the economy to pre-war monetary standards. During the War, Congress had authorized the Treasury to issue banknotes that, unlike the rest of the currency, were not backed by gold or silver. These "greenbacks" were necessary to pay the war debts, but caused inflation and forced gold-backed money out of circulation. On March 18, 1869, Grant signed the Public Credit Act of 1869, which guaranteed bondholders would be repaid in "coin or its equivalent". The act committed the government to the full return of the gold standard within ten years. This followed a policy of "hard currency, economy and gradual reduction of the national debt." Grant's own ideas about the economy were simple, and he relied on the advice of businessmen.

==== Gold corner conspiracy ====
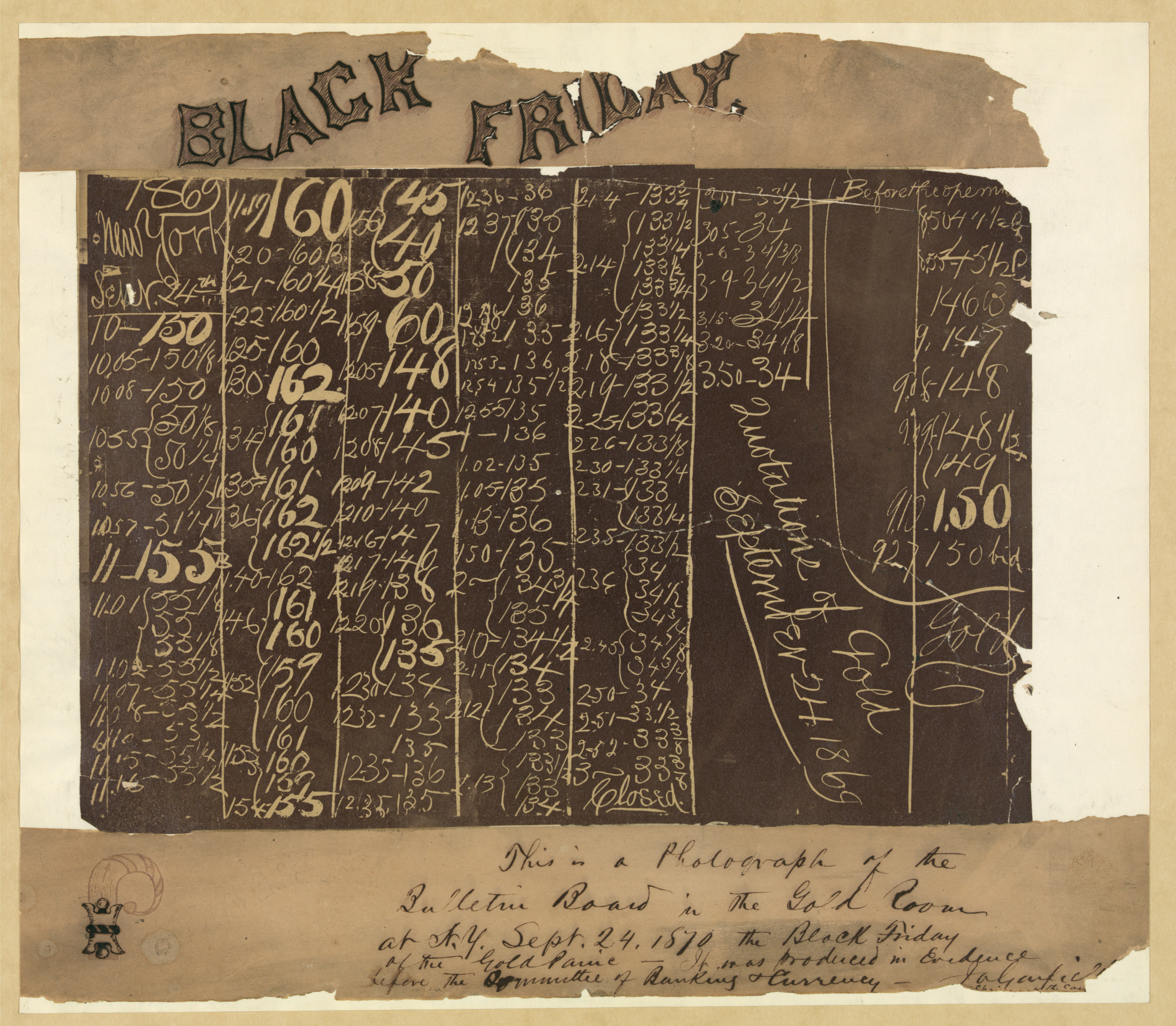
Photograph of the blackboard in the New York City Gold Room on Black Friday, showing the collapse of the price of gold

In April 1869, railroad tycoons Jay Gould and Jim Fisk conspired to corner the gold market in New York. They controlled the Erie Railroad, and a high gold price would allow foreign agriculture buyers to purchase exported crops, shipped east over the Erie's routes. Boutwell's policy of selling gold from the Treasury biweekly, however, kept gold artificially low. Unable to corrupt Boutwell, the schemers built a relationship with Grant's brother-in-law, Abel Corbin, and gained access to Grant. Gould bribed Assistant Treasurer Daniel Butterfield to gain inside information into the Treasury.

In July, Grant reduced the sale of Treasury gold to $2,000,000 per month. Fisk told Grant his gold selling policy would destroy the nation. By September, Grant, who was naive regarding finance, was convinced a low gold price would help farmers, and the sale of gold for September was not decreased. On September 23, when the gold price reached 143 1/8, Boutwell rushed to the White House and talked with Grant. On September 24, known as Black Friday, Grant ordered Boutwell to sell, whereupon Boutwell wired Butterfield to sell $4,000,000 in gold. The bull market at Gould's Gold Room collapsed, the price plummeted from 160 to 133 1/3, a bear market panic ensued, Gould and Fisk fled, and economic damages lasted months. By January 1870, the economy resumed its post-war recovery. (Note: An 1870 Congressional investigation chaired by James A. Garfield cleared Grant of profiteering, but excoriated Gould and Fisk for their manipulation of the gold market and Corbin for exploiting his personal connection to Grant.)

=== Foreign affairs ===
Grant had limited foreign policy experience, so relied heavily on his talented Secretary of State Hamilton Fish. Grant and Fish had cordial friendship. Besides Grant, the main players in foreign affairs were Fish and the chairman of the Senate Foreign Relations Committee Charles Sumner. Sumner, who hated Grant, led the opposition to Grant's plan to annex Santo Domingo, despite fully supporting annexation of Alaska.

Grant had an expansionist impulse to protect American interests abroad and was a strong advocate of the Monroe Doctrine. For instance, when Tomás Frías became President of Bolivia in 1872, Grant stressed the importance of maintaining good relations between the U.S. and Bolivia. Grant acted as international arbitror in the Bolama Question between Portugal and the United Kingdom, ruling in favor of Portugal.

==== Treaty of Washington (1871) ====
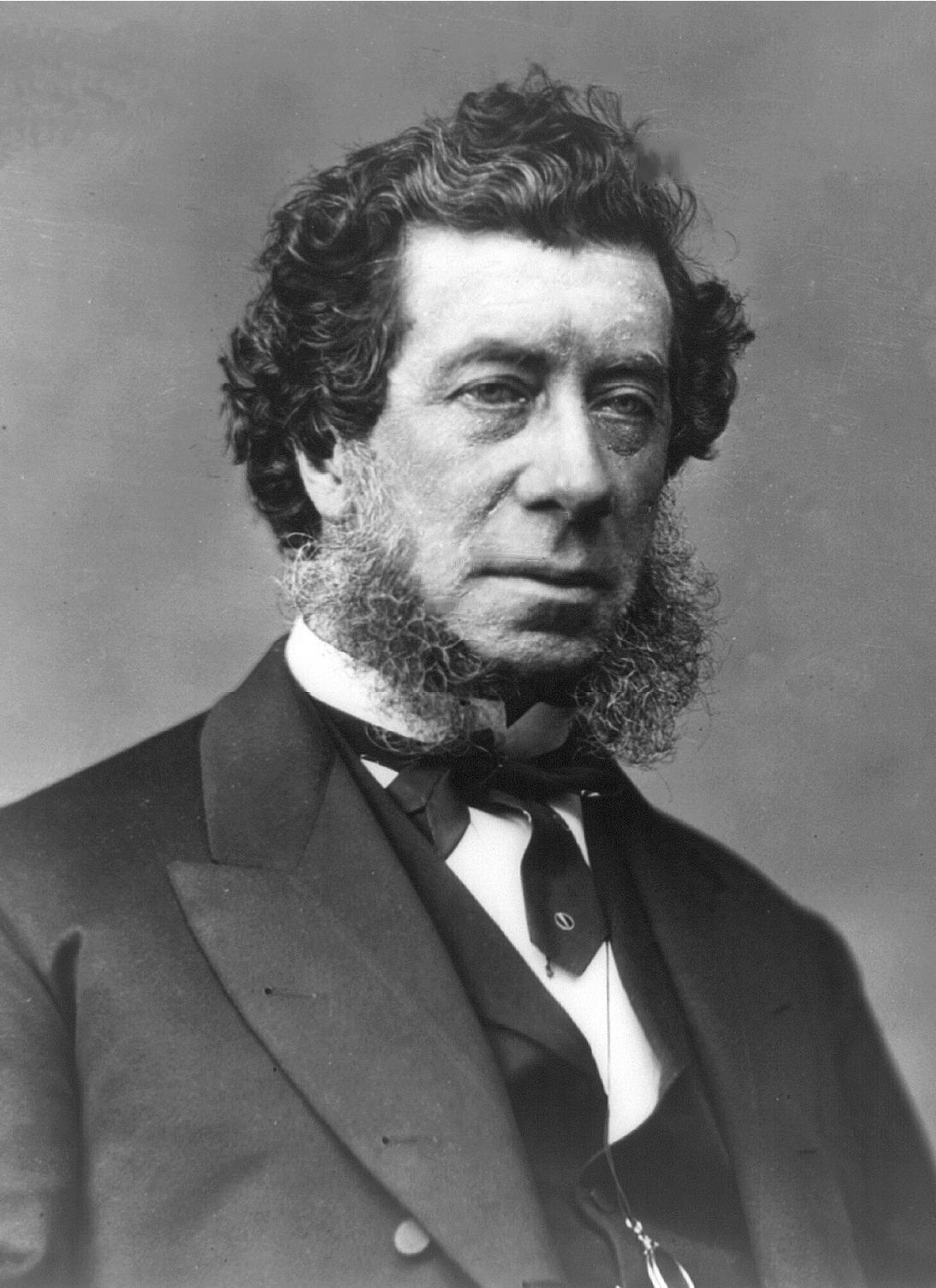
Secretary of State Hamilton Fish and Grant successfully settled the Alabama Claims by treaty and arbitration.

The most pressing diplomatic problem in 1869 was the settlement of the Alabama Claims, depredations caused to Union merchant ships by the Confederate warship CSS Alabama, built in a British shipyard in violation of neutrality rules. Fish played the central role in formulating and implementing the Treaty of Washington and the Geneva arbitration (1872). Senator Charles Sumner led the demand for reparations, with talk of British Columbia as payment. Sumner, among other politicians, argued that British complicity in arms delivery to the Confederacy via blockade runners prolonged the war. Fish and Treasurer George Boutwell convinced Grant that peaceful relations with Britain were essential, and the two nations agreed to negotiate.

To avoid jeopardizing negotiations, Grant refrained from recognizing Cuban rebels who were fighting for independence from Spain, which would have been inconsistent with American objections to the British granting belligerent status to Confederates. (Note: Urged by his Secretary of War Rawlins, Grant initially supported recognition of Cuban belligerency, but Rawlins's death on September 6, 1869, removed any cabinet support for military intervention.) A commission in Washington produced a treaty whereby an international tribunal would settle the damage amounts; the British admitted regret, but not fault. The Senate, including Grant critics Sumner and Carl Schurz, approved the Treaty of Washington, which settled disputes over fishing rights and maritime boundaries. The Alabama Claims settlement was Grant's most successful foreign policy achievement, securing peace with Great Britain. The settlement ($15,500,000) of the Alabama claims resolved troubled Anglo-American issues and turned Britain into America's strongest ally.

==== Korean expedition (1871) ====
In 1871, a U.S. expedition was sent to Korea to open up trade with a country which had a policy that excluded trading with foreign powers, and to learn the fate of U.S. merchant ship SS General Sherman, which had disappeared up the Taedong River in 1866. Grant dispatched a land and naval force consisting of five warships and over 1,200 men, under Admiral John Rodgers, to support a diplomatic delegation, led by U.S. ambassador to China, Frederick Low, sent to negotiate trade and political relations.

On June 1, the American ships entered the Ganghwa Straits on the Han River and, as foreign ships were barred from entering the river, onshore Korean garrisons fired upon the ships, but little damage was done. When Rodgers demanded an apology and to begin treaty negotiations, the Korean government refused. On June 10, Rodgers destroyed several Korean forts, culminating in the Battle of Ganghwa, at which 250 Koreans were killed with a loss of 3 Americans. The expedition failed to open up trade and merely strengthened Korea's isolationist policy.

==== Santo Domingo (Dominican Republic) ====
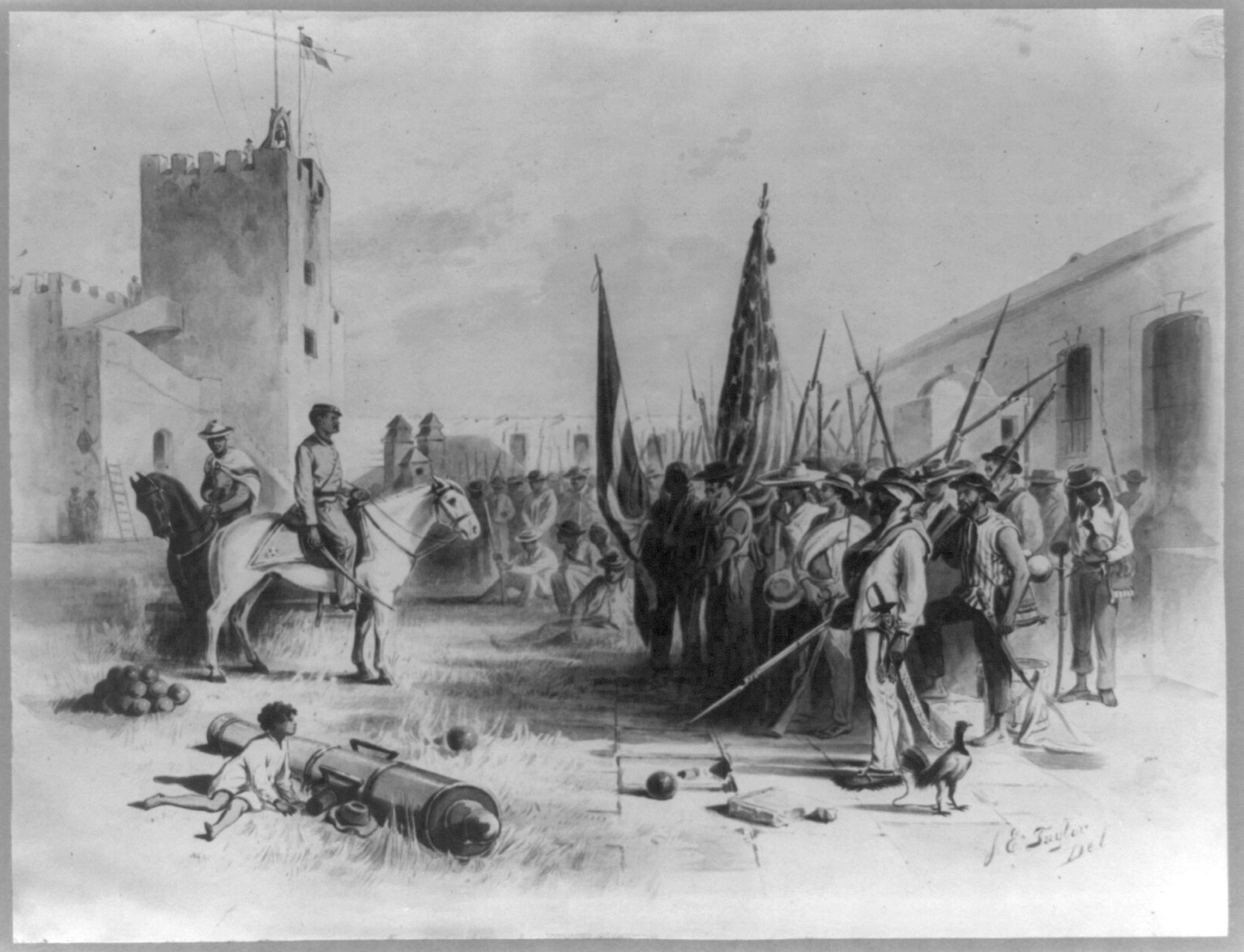
Santo Domingo City; watercolor by James E. Taylor, 1871

In 1869, Grant initiated his plan to annex the Dominican Republic, then called Santo Domingo. Grant believed acquisition would increase the United States' natural resources, strengthen U.S. naval protection to enforce the Monroe Doctrine, safeguard against British obstruction of U.S. shipping, protect a future oceanic canal and stop slavery in Cuba and Brazil, while black people in the United States would have a safe haven from "the crime of Klu Kluxism".

Joseph W. Fabens, an American speculator who represented Buenaventura Báez, the president of the Dominican Republic, met with Secretary Fish and proposed annexation. On July 17, Grant sent a military aide Orville E. Babcock to evaluate the islands' resources, local conditions, and Báez's terms for annexation, but gave him no diplomatic authority. When Babcock returned to Washington with unauthorized annexation treaties, Grant pressured his cabinet to accept them. Grant ordered Fish to draw up formal treaties, sent to Báez by Babcock's return to the island nation. The Dominican Republic would be annexed for $1.5 million and Samaná Bay would be lease-purchased for $2 million. Generals D.B. Sackett and Rufus Ingalls accompanied Babcock. On November 29, President Báez signed the treaties. On December 21, the treaties were placed before Grant and his cabinet.

Grant's plan, however, was obstructed by Senator Charles Sumner. On December 31, Grant met with Sumner at Sumner's home to gain his support for annexation. Grant left confident that Sumner approved, but what Sumner actually said was disputed by various witnesses. Without appealing to the American public, Grant submitted the treaties on January 10, 1870, to the Senate Foreign Relations Committee, chaired by Sumner, for ratification, but Sumner shelved the bills. Prompted by Grant to stop stalling the treaties, Sumner's committee took action but rejected the bills by a 5-to-2 vote. Sumner opposed annexation largely on anti-imperialist grounds, fearing the United States was "engaged in forcing upon a weak people the sacrifice of their country." Sumner sent the treaties for a full Senate vote, while Grant personally lobbied other senators. Despite Grant's efforts, the Senate defeated the treaties.

Grant was outraged, and on July 1, 1870, he sacked his appointed Minister to Great Britain, John Lothrop Motley, Sumner's friend and ally. In January 1871, Grant signed a joint resolution to send a commission to investigate annexation. He chose three neutral parties, with Frederick Douglass to be secretary of the commission, that gave Grant the moral high ground from Sumner. Although the commission approved its findings, the Senate remained opposed, forcing Grant to abandon further efforts. Seeking retribution, in March 1871, Grant maneuvered to have Sumner deposed from his powerful Senate chairmanship. The stinging controversy over Santo Domingo overshadowed Grant's foreign diplomacy. Critics complained of Grant's reliance on military personnel to implement his policies.

==== Cuba and Virginius Affair ====
American policy under Grant was to remain neutral during the Ten Years' War (1868–78) in Cuba against Spanish rule. On the recommendation of Fish and Sumner, Grant refused to recognize the rebels, in effect endorsing Spanish colonial rule, while calling for the abolition of slavery in Cuba. This was done to protect American commerce and to keep peace with Spain.

This fragile policy was broken in October 1873, when a Spanish cruiser captured a merchant ship, Virginius, flying the U.S. flag, carrying supplies and men to aid the insurrection. Treating them as pirates, Spanish authorities executed 53 prisoners without trial, including eight Americans. American Captain Joseph Frye and his crew were executed and their bodies mutilated. Enraged Americans called for war with Spain. Grant ordered U.S. Navy Squadron warships to converge on Cuba. On November 27, Fish reached a diplomatic resolution in which Spain's president, Emilio Castelar y Ripoll, expressed his regret, surrendered the Virginius and the surviving captives. Spain paid $80,000 to the families of the executed Americans.

==== Free trade with Hawaii ====
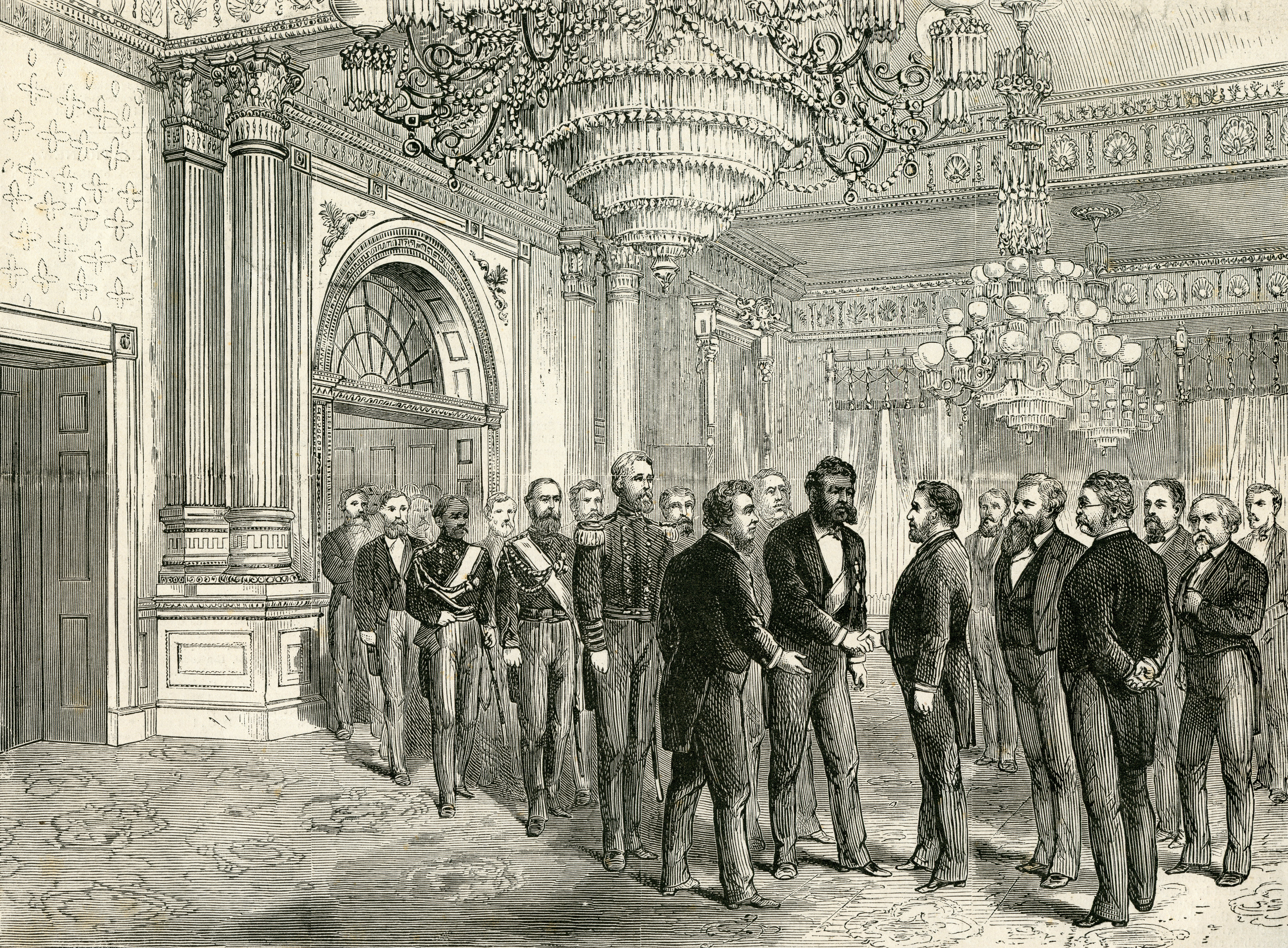
King Kalākaua of Hawaii meets President Grant at the White House on his state visit, 1874.

In the face of strong opposition from Democrats, Grant and Fish secured a free trade treaty in 1875 with Hawaii, incorporating its sugar industry into the U.S. economic sphere. To secure the agreement, King Kalākaua made a 91-day state visit, the first reigning monarch to set foot in the United States. Despite opposition from Southern Democrats, who wanted to protect American rice and sugar producers, and Democrats, who believed the treaty to be an island annexation attempt and referred to the Hawaiians as an "inferior" race, a bill implementing the treaty passed Congress.

The treaty gave free access to the U.S. market for sugar and other products grown in Hawaii from September 1876. The U.S. gained lands in the area known as Puʻu Loa for what would become known as the Pearl Harbor naval base. The treaty led to large investment by Americans in sugar plantations in Hawaii.

=== Federal Indian policy ===
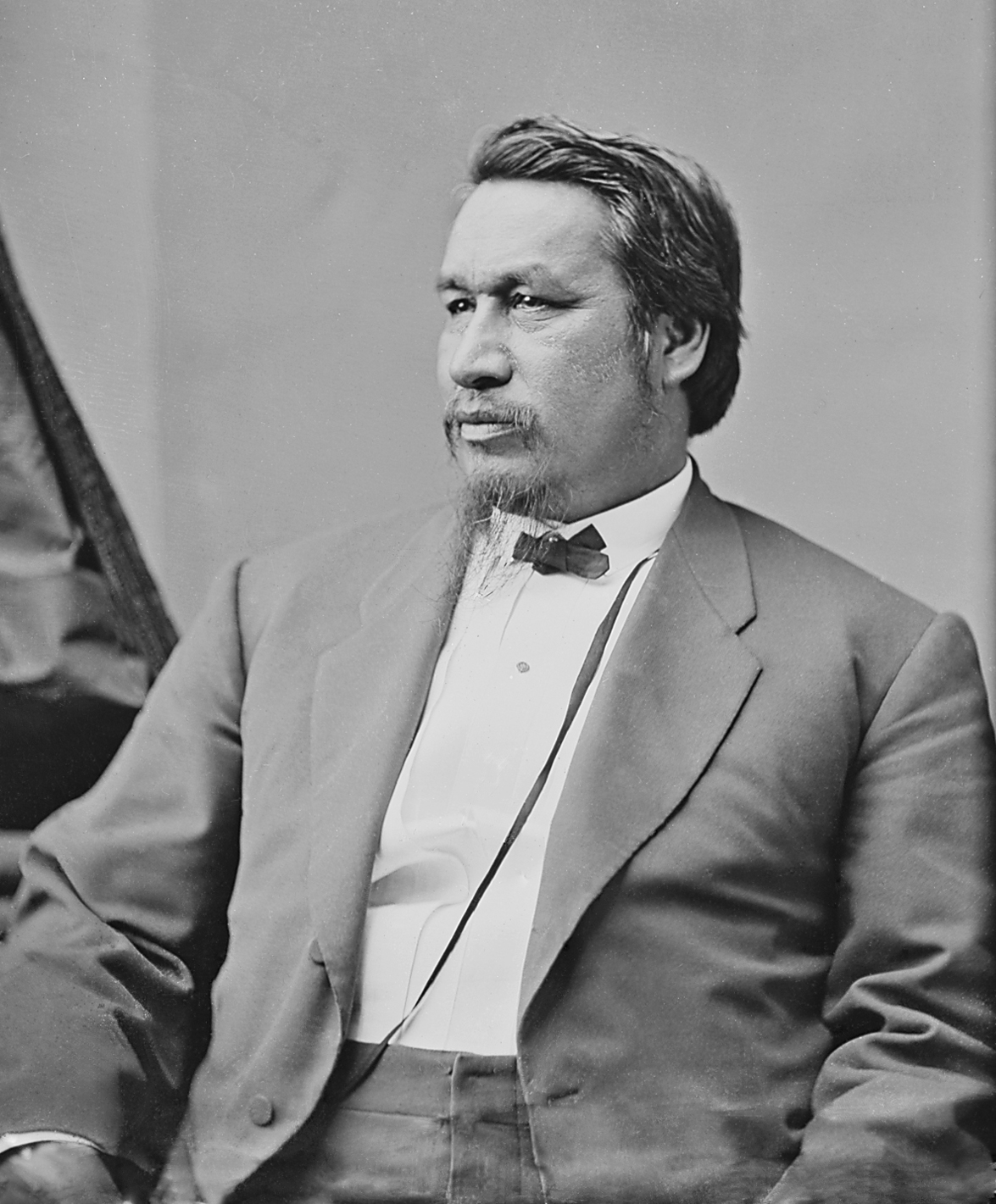
Ely Samuel Parker, appointed by President Grant as the first Native American (Seneca) Commissioner of Indian Affairs

When Grant took office in 1869, the nation's more than 250,000 Native Americans were governed by 370 treaties. Grant's faith influenced his "peace" policy, believing that the "Creator" did not place races of men on earth for the "stronger" to destroy the "weaker". Grant was mostly an assimilationist, wanting Native Americans to adopt European customs, practices, and language, and accept democratic government, leading to eventual citizenship. At Grant's 1869 Inauguration, Grant said "I will favor any course towards them which tends to their civilization, Christianization and ultimate citizenship." Grant appointed Ely S. Parker, an assimilated Seneca and member of his wartime staff, as the Commissioner of Indian Affairs, the first Native American to serve in this position, surprising many.

In April 1869, Grant signed legislation establishing an unpaid Board of Indian Commissioners to reduce corruption and oversee the implementation of his "Peace" policy, aimed to replace entrepreneurs serving as Native American agents with missionaries and to protect Native Americans on reservations and educate them in farming.

In 1870, a setback in Grant's policy occurred over the Marias Massacre, causing public outrage. In 1871, Grant ended the sovereign tribal treaty system; by law individual Native Americans were deemed wards of the federal government. Grant's policy was undermined by Parker's resignation in 1871, denominational infighting among religious agents, and entrenched economic interests. Nonetheless, Indian wars declined overall during Grant's first term, and on October 1, 1872, Major General Oliver Otis Howard negotiated peace with the Apache leader Cochise. On December 28, 1872, another setback took place when General George Crook and the 5th Cavalry massacred about 75 Yavapai Apache Indians at Skeleton Cave, Arizona.

On April 11, 1873, Major General Edward Canby was killed in North California by Modoc leader Kintpuash. Grant ordered restraint. The army captured Kintpuash and his followers, who were convicted of Canby's murder and hanged on October 3, while the remaining Modoc were relocated to the Indian Territory. The beginning of the Indian Wars has been dated to this event.

In 1874, the army defeated the Comanche at the Battle of Palo Duro Canyon, forcing them to settle at the Fort Sill reservation in 1875. Grant pocket-vetoed a bill in 1874 protecting bison and instead supported Interior Secretary Columbus Delano, who correctly believed killing bison would force Plains Indians to abandon their nomadic lifestyle. In April 1875, another setback occurred: the U.S. Army massacred 27 Cheyenne Indians in Kansas.

With the lure of gold discovered in the Black Hills and the westward force of Manifest Destiny, white settlers trespassed on Sioux protected lands. Red Cloud reluctantly entered negotiations on May 26, 1875, but other Sioux chiefs readied for war. Grant told the Sioux leaders to make "arrangements to allow white persons to go into the Black Hills" and that their children would attend schools, speak English, and prepare "for the life of white men."

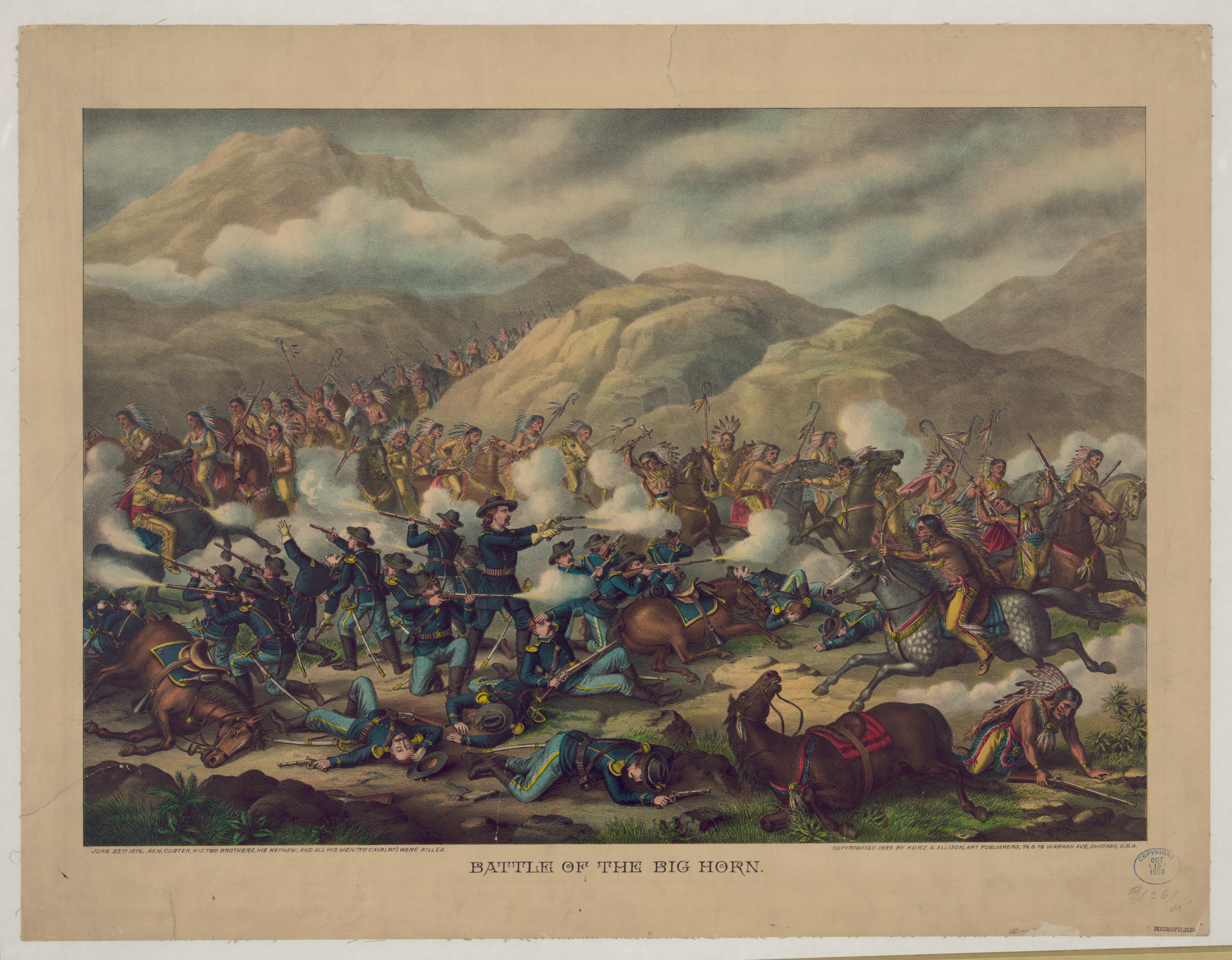
The Battle of the Little Big Horn, 1876

On November 3, 1875, under advice from Sheridan, Grant agreed not to enforce excluding miners from the Black Hills, forcing Native Americans onto the Sioux reservation. Sheridan told Grant that the U.S. Army was undermanned and the territory involved was vast, requiring many soldiers.

During the Great Sioux War that started after Sitting Bull refused to relocate to agency land, warriors led by Crazy Horse massacred George Armstrong Custer and his men at the Battle of the Little Big Horn. Angry white settlers demanded retribution. Grant castigated Custer in the press, saying "I regard Custer's massacre as a sacrifice of troops, brought on by Custer himself, that was wholly unnecessary." In September and October 1876, Grant persuaded the tribes to relinquish the Black Hills. Congress ratified the agreement three days before Grant left office in 1877.

In spite of Grant's peace efforts, over 200 battles were fought with Native Americans during his presidency. Grant's peace policy survived Custer's death, even after Grant left office in 1877; Indian policy remained under the Interior Department rather than the War Department. The policy was considered humanitarian for its time but later criticized for disregarding tribal cultures.

=== Election of 1872 and second term ===
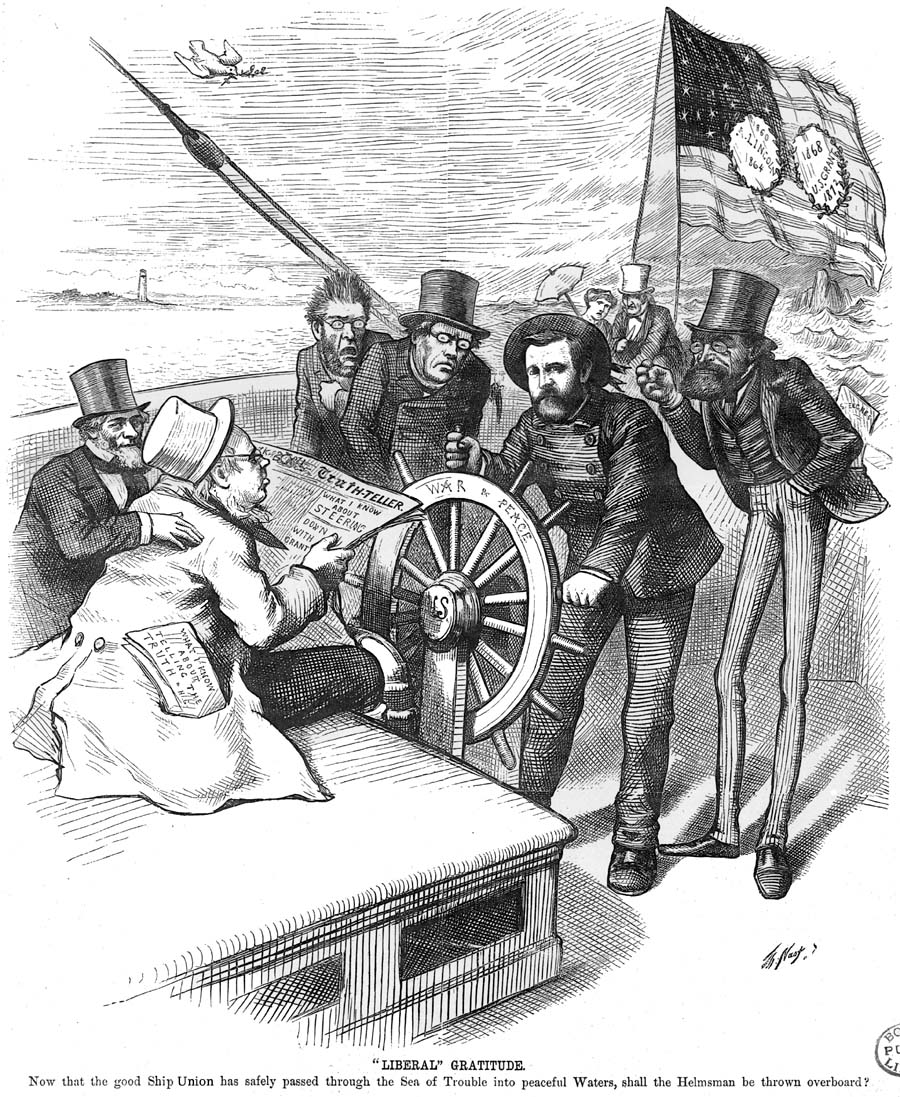
Cartoon by Thomas Nast on Grant's opponents in the reelection campaign

The Liberal Republicans—reformers, men who supported low tariffs, and those who opposed Grant's prosecution of the Klan—broke from Grant and the Republican Party. The Liberals disliked Grant's alliance with Senators Simon Cameron and Roscoe Conkling, considered to be spoilsmen politicians.

In 1872, the Liberals nominated Horace Greeley, a New York Tribune editor and enemy of Grant, for president, and Missouri governor B. Gratz Brown, for vice president. The Liberals denounced Grantism, corruption, and inefficiency, and demanded withdrawal of federal troops from the South, literacy tests for black voters, and amnesty for Confederates. The Democrats adopted the Greeley-Brown ticket and the Liberals' party platform. Greeley pushed the themes that the Grant administration was failed and corrupt.

The Republicans nominated Grant for reelection, with Senator Henry Wilson of Massachusetts as the vice presidential nominee. (Note: Details revealed of the 1867 Crédit Mobilier bribery scandal, implicating both Colfax and Wilson, stung the Grant administration, but Grant was not connected to the corruption.) The Republicans shrewdly borrowed from the Liberal platform, including "extended amnesty, lowered tariffs, and embraced civil service reform." Grant lowered customs duties, gave amnesty to Confederates, and implemented a civil service merit system, neutralizing the opposition. To placate the burgeoning suffragist movement, the Republican platform said women's rights would be treated with "respectful consideration." Concerning Southern policy, Greeley advocated that local government control be given to white people, while Grant advocated federal protection of black people. Grant was supported by Frederick Douglass, prominent abolitionists, and Indian reformers.

Grant won reelection easily thanks to federal prosecution of the Klan, a strong economy, debt reduction, and lowered tariffs and taxes. He received 56% of the vote and an Electoral College landslide (286 to 66). Most African Americans in the South voted for Grant, while Democratic opposition remained mostly peaceful. Grant lost in six former slave states that wanted an end to Reconstruction. He proclaimed the victory as a personal vindication, but felt betrayed by the Liberals.

Grant was sworn in by Salmon P. Chase on March 4, 1873. In his second inaugural address, he focused on what he considered the chief issues: freedom and fairness for all Americans and the benefits of citizenship for freed slaves. Grant concluded his address: "My efforts in the future will be directed towards the restoration of good feelings between the different sections of our common community". (Note: The day after his inauguration, Grant wrote a letter to Colfax expressing his faith and trust in Colfax's integrity and allowed him to publish the letter, but the effort only served to compromise Grant's reputation.) Wilson died in office on November 22, 1875. With Wilson's loss, Grant relied on Fish's guidance more than ever.

=== Panic of 1873 and loss of House ===
Grant signed the Coinage Act of 1873, effectively ending the legal basis for bimetallism. The Coinage Act discontinued the standard silver dollar and established the gold dollar as the monetary standard; because the gold supply did not increase as quickly as the population, the result was deflation. Silverites, who wanted more money in circulation to raise the prices farmers received, denounced the move as the "Crime of 1873", claiming deflation made debts more burdensome for farmers.

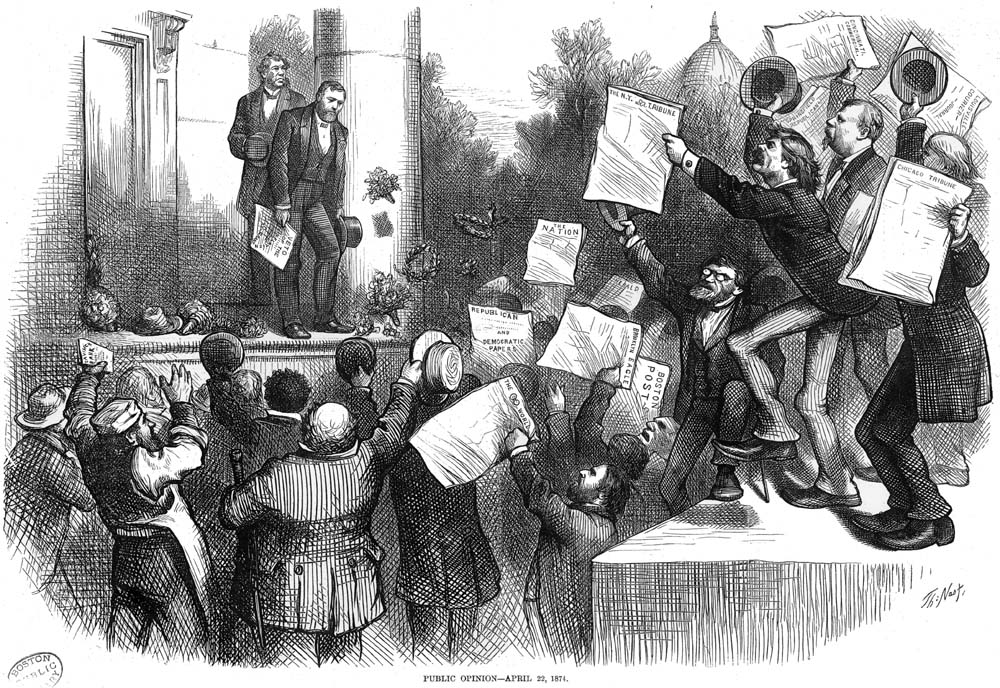
Grant is congratulated for vetoing the "inflation bill" in 1874.

Economic turmoil renewed during Grant's second term. In September 1873, Jay Cooke & Company, a New York brokerage house, collapsed after it failed to sell all the bonds issued by Northern Pacific Railway. Other banks and brokerages that owned railroad stocks and bonds were ruined. Grant, who knew little about finance, traveled to New York to consult leading businessmen on how to resolve the crisis, which became known as the Panic of 1873. Grant believed that, as with the collapse of the Gold Ring in 1869, the panic was merely an economic fluctuation. He instructed the Treasury to buy $10 million in government bonds, which curbed the panic, but the Long Depression, swept the nation. Eighty-nine of the nation's 364 railroads went bankrupt.

In 1874, hoping inflation would stimulate the economy, Congress passed the Ferry Bill. Many farmers and workingmen favored the bill, which would have added $64 million in greenbacks to circulation, but some Eastern bankers opposed it because it would have weakened the dollar. Belknap, Williams, and Delano told Grant a veto would hurt Republicans in the November elections. Grant believed the bill would destroy the credit of the nation and vetoed it despite their objections. Grant's veto placed him in the Republican conservative faction and began the party's commitment to a gold-backed dollar. Grant later pressured Congress for a bill to strengthen the dollar by gradually reducing the greenbacks in circulation. When the Democrats gained a majority in the House after the 1874 elections, the lame-duck Republican Congress did so before the Democrats took office. On January 14, 1875, Grant signed the Specie Payment Resumption Act, which required reduction of greenbacks allowed to circulate and declared that they would be redeemed for gold beginning on January 1, 1879.

=== Reforms and scandals ===
The post-Civil War economy brought on massive industrial wealth and government expansion. Speculation, lifestyle extravagance, and corruption in federal offices were rampant. All of Grant's executive departments were investigated by Congress. Grant by nature was honest, trusting, gullible, and loyal to his friends. His responses to malfeasance were mixed: at times appointing cabinet reformers, at others defending culprits.

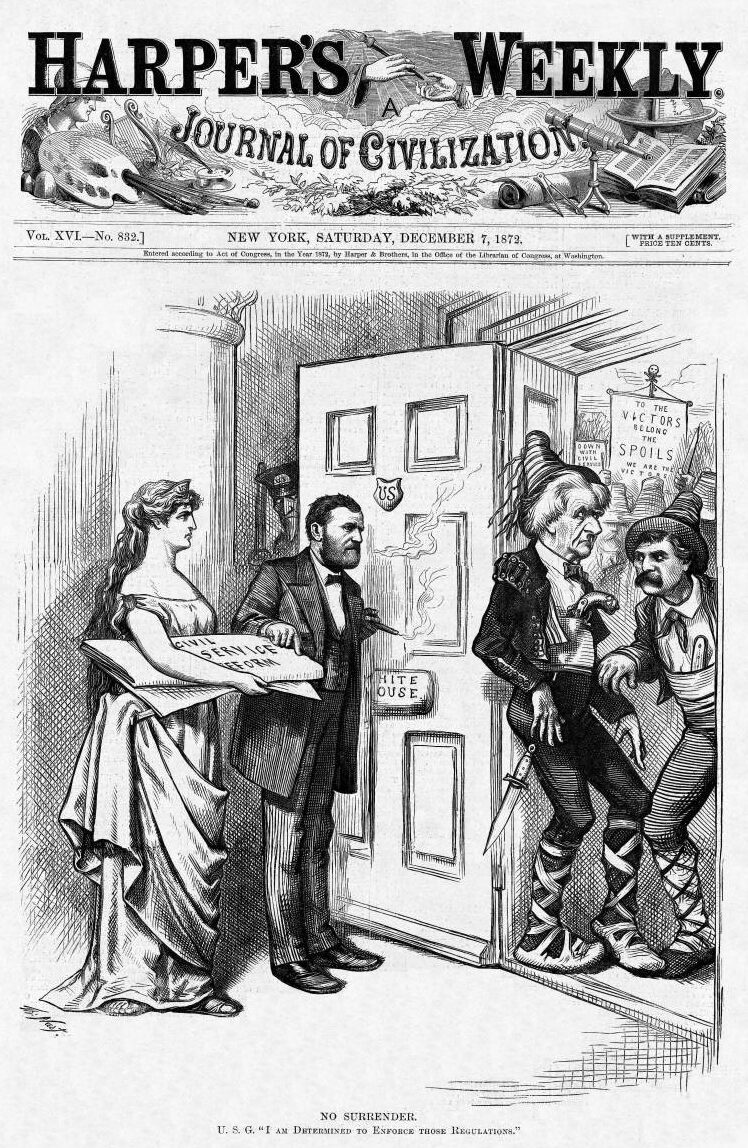
Cartoonist Thomas Nast praises Grant for rejecting demands by Pennsylvania politicians to suspend civil service rules.

Grant in his first term appointed Secretary of the Interior Jacob D. Cox, who implemented civil service reform, including firing unqualified clerks. On October 3, 1870, Cox resigned after a dispute with Grant over handling of a mining claim. Authorized by Congress on March 3, 1871, Grant created and appointed the first Civil Service Commission. Grant's Commission created rules for competitive exams for appointments, ending mandatory political assessments and classifying positions into grades. (Note: When Congress failed to make the Commission's reform rules permanent, Grant dissolved the Commission in 1874.)

In November 1871, Grant's appointed New York Collector, Thomas Murphy, resigned. Grant replaced him with Chester A. Arthur, who implemented Boutwell's reforms. A Senate committee investigated the New York Customs House in 1872. Previous Grant-appointed collectors Murphy and Moses H. Grinnell charged lucrative fees for warehouse space, without the legal requirement of listing the goods. This led to Grant firing warehouse owner George K. Leet, for pocketing the exorbitant freight fees. Boutwell's reforms included stricter record-keeping and that goods be stored on company docks. Grant ordered prosecutions by Attorney General George H. Williams and Secretary of the Treasury Boutwell of persons accepting and paying bribes.

On March 3, 1873, Grant signed into law an appropriation act that increased pay for federal employees, Congress (retroactive), the judiciary, and the president. Grant's annual salary doubled to $50,000. Critics derided Congress's two-year retroactive $4,000 payment for each Congressman, and the law was partially repealed. Grant kept his much-needed pay raise, while his reputation remained intact.

In 1872, Grant signed into law an act that ended private moiety (tax collection) contracts, but an attached rider allowed three more contracts. Boutwell's assistant secretary William A. Richardson hired John B. Sanborn to go after "individuals and cooperations" who allegedly evaded taxes. Sanborn aggressively collected $213,000, while splitting $156,000 to others, including Richardson, and the Republican Party campaign committee. During an 1874 Congressional investigation, Richardson denied involvement, but Sanborn said he met with Richardson over the contracts. Congress severely condemned Richardson's permissive manner. Grant appointed Richardson judge of the Court of Claims, and replaced him with reformer Benjamin Bristow. In June, Grant and Congress abolished the moiety system.

Bristow tightened up the Treasury's investigation force, implemented civil service reform, and fired hundreds of corrupt appointees. Bristow discovered Treasury receipts were low, and launched an investigation that uncovered the notorious Whiskey Ring, that involved collusion between distillers and Treasury officials to evade millions in taxes. In mid-April, Bristow informed Grant of the ring. On May 10, Bristow struck hard and broke the ring. Federal marshals raided 32 installations nationwide, leading to 110 convictions and $3,150,000 in fines.

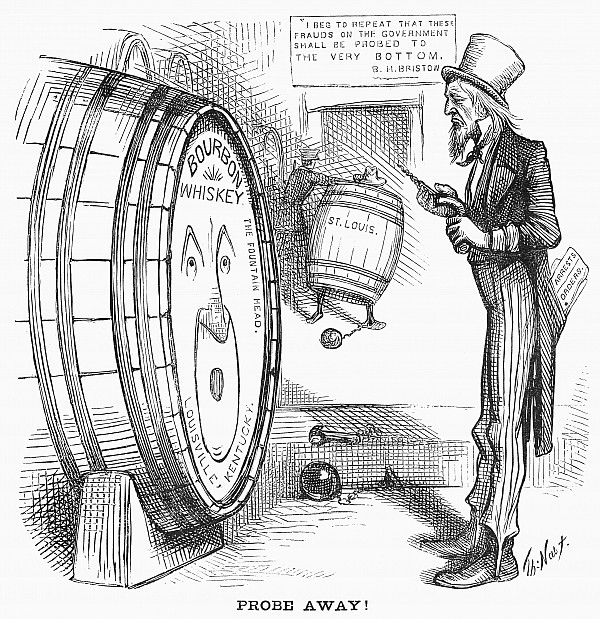
Harper's Weekly cartoon on Bristow's Whiskey Ring investigation

Grant appointed David Dyer, under Bristow's recommendation, federal attorney to prosecute the Ring in St. Louis, who indicted Grant's friend General John McDonald, supervisor of Internal Revenue. Grant endorsed Bristow's investigation, writing on a letter "Let no guilty man escape..." Bristow's investigation discovered Babcock received kickback payments, and that Babcock had secretly forewarned McDonald, the ring's mastermind, of the investigation. On November 22, the jury convicted McDonald. On December 9, Babcock was indicted; Grant refused to believe in Babcock's guilt and was ready to testify in Babcock's favor, but Fish warned that doing so would put Grant in the embarrassing position of testifying against a case prosecuted by his own administration. Instead, on February 12, 1876, Grant gave a deposition in Babcock's defense, expressing that his confidence in his secretary was "unshaken". Grant's testimony silenced all but his strongest critics.

The St. Louis jury acquitted Babcock, and Grant allowed him to remain at the White House. However, after Babcock was indicted in a frame-up of a Washington reformer, called the Safe Burglary Conspiracy, Grant dismissed him. Babcock kept his position of Superintendent of Public Buildings in Washington.

The Interior Department under Secretary Columbus Delano, whom Grant appointed to replace Cox, was rife with fraud and corruption. The exception was Delano's effective oversight of Yellowstone. Grant reluctantly forced Delano's resignation. Surveyor General Silas Reed had set up corrupt contracts that benefited Delano's son, John Delano. Grant's Secretary of the Interior Zachariah Chandler, who succeeded Delano in 1875, implemented reforms, fired corrupt agents and ended profiteering. When Grant was informed by Postmaster General Marshall Jewell of a potential Congressional investigation into an extortion scandal involving Attorney General George H. Williams's wife, Grant fired Williams and appointed reformer Edwards Pierrepont. Grant's new cabinet appointments temporarily appeased reformers.

After the Democrats took control of the House in 1875, more corruption in federal departments was exposed. Among the most damaging scandal involved Secretary of War William W. Belknap, who took quarterly kickbacks from the Fort Sill tradership; he resigned in February 1876. Belknap was impeached by the House but was acquitted by the Senate. Grant's brother Orvil set up "silent partnerships" and received kickbacks from four trading posts. Congress discovered that Secretary of the Navy Robeson had been bribed by a naval contractor, but no articles of impeachment were drawn up. In his December 5, 1876, Annual Message, Grant apologized to the nation: "Failures have been errors of judgement, not of intent."

=== Election of 1876 ===
The abandonment of Reconstruction played a central role during the 1876 election. Mounting investigations into corruption by the House, controlled by the Democrats, discredited Grant's presidency. Grant did not run for a third term, while the Republicans chose Governor Rutherford B. Hayes of Ohio, a reformer, at their convention. The Democrats nominated Governor Samuel J. Tilden of New York. Voting irregularities in three Southern states caused the election to remain undecided for several months.

Grant told Congress to settle the matter through legislation and assured both sides that he would not use the army to force a result, except to curb violence. On January 29, 1877, he signed legislation forming an Electoral Commission, which ruled Hayes elected president; to forestall Democratic protests, Republicans agreed to the Compromise of 1877, in which the last troops were withdrawn from Southern capitals. With Reconstruction dead, 80 years of Jim Crow segregation was launched. Grant's "calm visage" throughout the election crisis appeased the nation.

== Post-presidency (1877–1885) ==
After leaving the White House, Grant said he "was never so happy in my life". The Grants left Washington for New York, to attend the birth of their daughter Nellie's child. Calling themselves "waifs", the Grants toured Cincinnati, St. Louis, Chicago, and Galena, without a clear idea of where they would live.

=== World tour and diplomacy ===
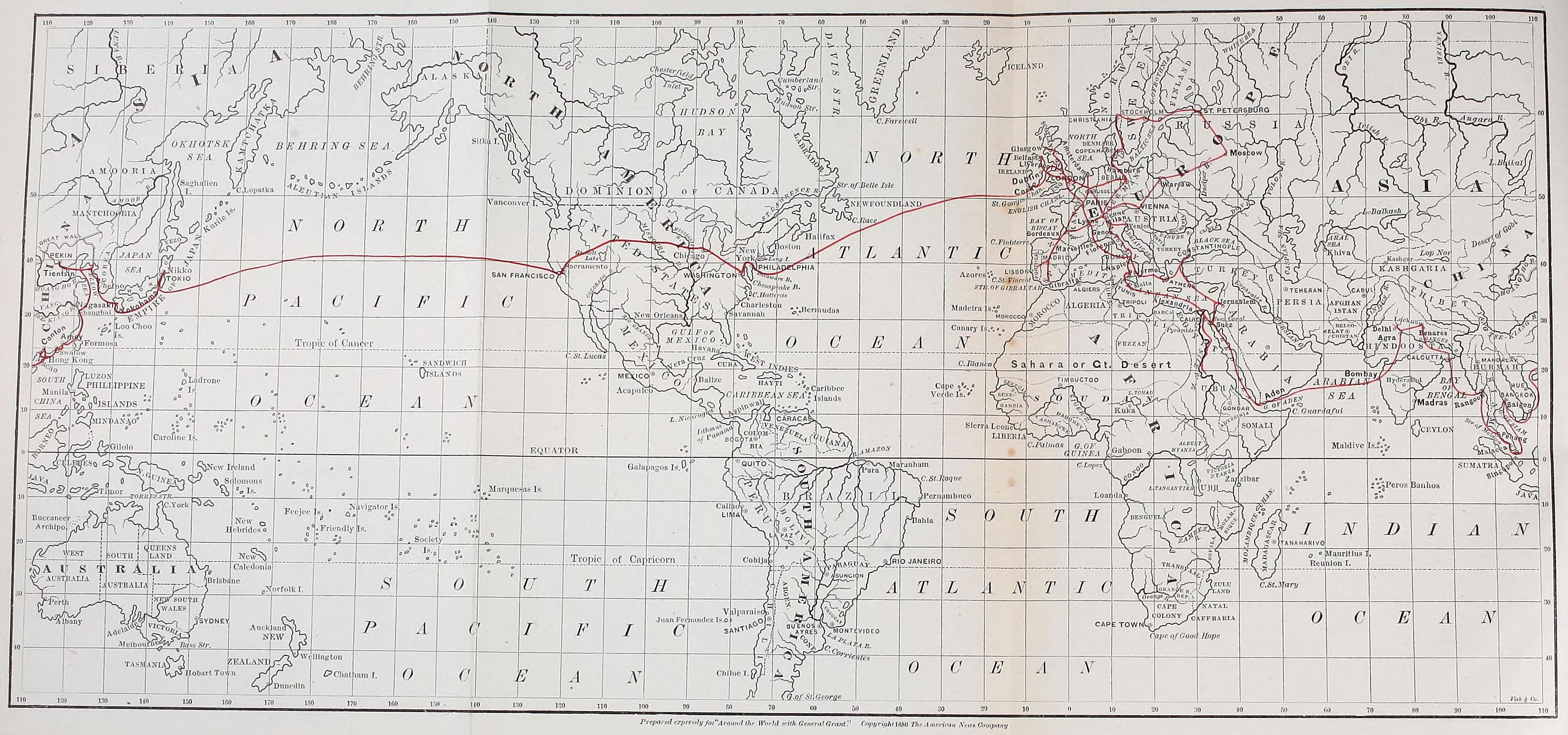
Map of Grant's world tour by J. S. Kemp, 1879

Using $25,000 (equivalent to $756,000 in 2025) from liquidating an investment in a Nevada-based mining company, the Grants set out on a world tour for approximately two-and-a-half years. On May 16, they left for England aboard the SS Indiana. During the tour, the Grants made stops in Europe, Africa, India, the Middle East and the Far East, meeting with dignitaries such as Queen Victoria, Tsar Alexander II, Pope Leo XIII, Otto von Bismarck, Li Hongzhang, and Emperor Meiji.

As a courtesy to Grant by the Hayes administration, his touring party received federal transportation on three U.S. Navy ships: a five-month tour of the Mediterranean on the USS Vandalia, travel from Hong Kong to China on the USS Ashuelot, and from China to Japan on the USS Richmond. The Hayes administration encouraged Grant to assume a public unofficial diplomatic role and strengthen American interests abroad during the tour. Homesick, the Grants left Japan on the SS City of Tokio and landed in San Francisco on September 20, 1879, greeted by cheering crowds. Grant's tour demonstrated to Europe and Asia that the United States was an emerging world power.

=== Third term attempt ===
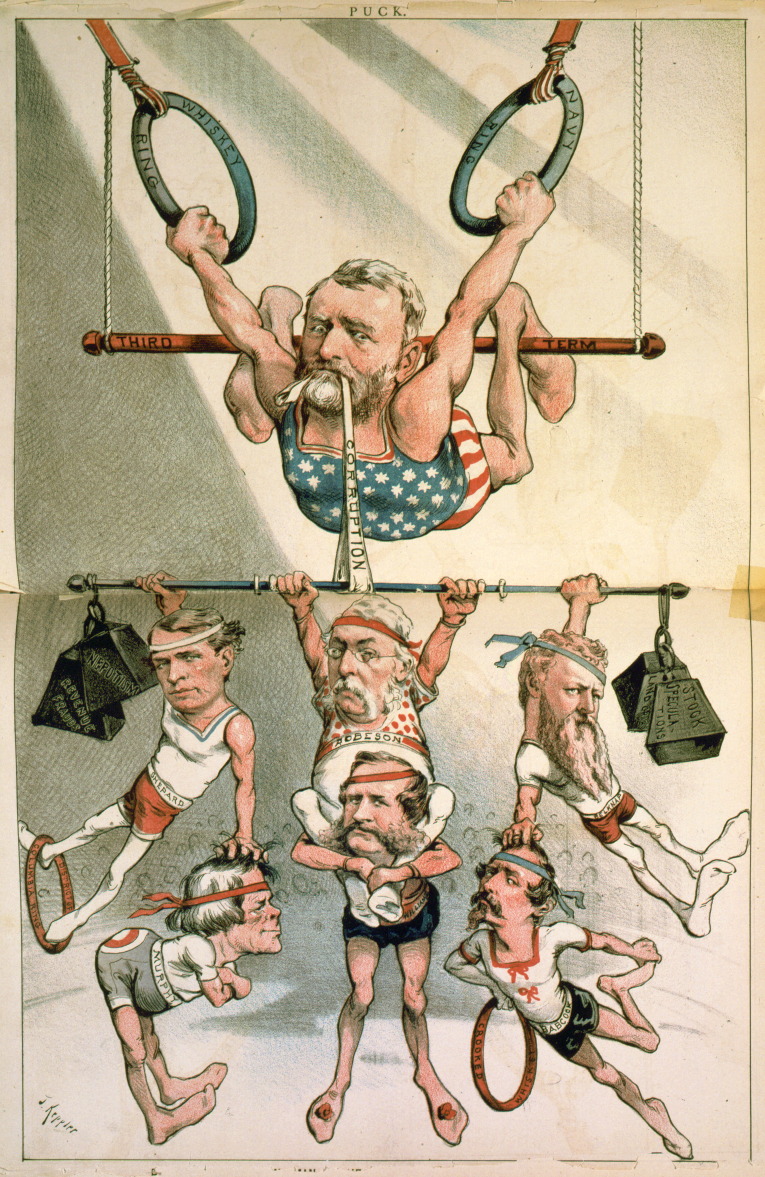
Cartoonist Joseph Keppler lampooned Grant and his associates. Puck, 1880

Politically conservative, Grant was supported by the Stalwarts who, led by his old political ally Roscoe Conkling, saw Grant's renewed popularity as an opportunity, and sought to nominate him for the presidency in 1880. Opponents called it a violation of the unofficial two-term rule in use since the time of George Washington. Grant said nothing publicly, but sought the job and encouraged his men. Washburne urged him to run; Grant demurred. Even so, Conkling and John A. Logan began to organize delegates in Grant's favor. When the convention convened in Chicago in June, more delegates were pledged to Grant than to any other candidate, but he was still short of a majority vote.

At the convention, Conkling nominated Grant with an eloquent speech, the most famous line being "When asked which state he hails from, our sole reply shall be, he hails from Appomattox and its famous apple tree." With 378 votes needed for the nomination, the first ballot had Grant at 304, Blaine at 284, Sherman at 93, and the rest to minor candidates. After thirty-six ballots, Blaine's delegates combined with those of other candidates to nominate a compromise candidate: James A. Garfield. A procedural motion made the vote unanimous for Garfield. Grant gave speeches for Garfield but declined to criticize the Democratic nominee, Winfield Scott Hancock, a general who had served under him. Garfield won the election. Grant gave Garfield his public support and pushed him to include Stalwarts in his administration. On July 2, 1881, Garfield was shot by an assassin and died on September 19. On learning from a reporter that Garfield was dead, Grant wept.

=== Business failures ===
In the 19th century, there were no federal presidential pensions, and the Grants' personal income was $6,000 a year. Grant's world tour had been costly, and he had depleted most of his savings. Wealthy friends bought him a house on New York City's Upper East Side, and to make an income, Grant, Jay Gould, and former Mexican Finance Secretary Matías Romero chartered the Mexican Southern Railroad, with plans to build a railroad from Oaxaca to Mexico City. Grant urged President Chester A. Arthur to negotiate a free trade treaty with Mexico. Arthur and the Mexican government agreed, but the United States Senate rejected the treaty in 1883. The railroad was similarly unsuccessful, falling into bankruptcy the following year.

At the same time, Grant's son Buck had opened a Wall Street brokerage house with Ferdinand Ward. A conniving man who swindled numerous wealthy men, Ward was at the time regarded as a rising star on Wall Street. The firm, Grant & Ward, was initially successful. In 1883, Grant joined the firm and invested $100,000 (~$2.93 million in 2025) of his own money. Ward paid investors abnormally high interest by pledging the company's securities on multiple loans in a process called rehypothecation (now regarded as a Ponzi scheme). Ward, in collusion with banker James D. Fish and kept secret from bank examiners, retrieved the firm's securities from the company's bank vault. When the trades went bad, multiple loans came due, all backed by the same collateral.

Historians agree that the elder Grant was likely unaware of Ward's intentions, but it is unclear how much Buck Grant knew. In May 1884, enough investments went bad to convince Ward that the firm would soon be bankrupt. Ward, who assumed Grant was "a child in business matters", told him of the impending failure, but assured Grant that this was a temporary shortfall. Grant approached businessman William Henry Vanderbilt, who gave him a personal loan of $150,000. Grant invested the money in the firm, but it was not enough to save it. The fall of Grant & Ward set off the Panic of 1884.

Vanderbilt offered to forgive Grant's debt entirely, but Grant refused. Impoverished but compelled by personal honor, he repaid what he could with his Civil War mementos and the sale or transfer of all other assets. Vanderbilt took the title to Grant's home, although he allowed the Grants to continue to reside there, and pledged to donate the souvenirs to the federal government and insisted the debt had been paid in full. Grant was distraught over Ward's deception and asked privately how he could ever "trust any human being again." In March 1885, he testified against both Ward and Fish. After the collapse of Grant & Ward, there was an outpouring of sympathy for Grant.

=== Memoirs, military pension, illness and death ===
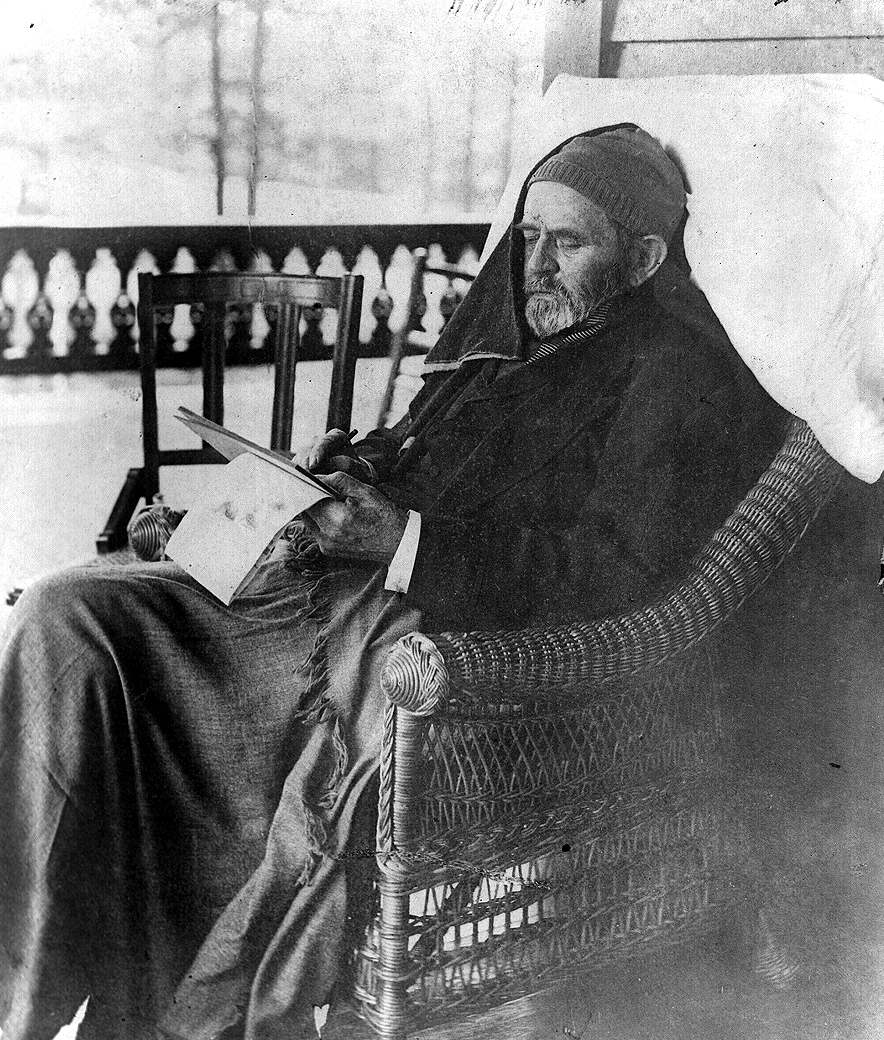
Grant working on his memoirs, less than a month before his death

Grant attended a service for Civil War veterans in Ocean Grove, New Jersey, on August 4, 1884, receiving a standing ovation from the ten thousand attendees; it would be his last public appearance. In the summer of 1884, Grant complained of a sore throat but put off seeing a doctor until late October, when he learned it was cancer, possibly caused by his frequent cigar smoking. Grant chose not to reveal the seriousness of his condition to his wife, who soon found out from Grant's doctor. In March 1885, The New York Times announced that Grant was dying of cancer, causing nationwide public concern. Knowing of Grant and Julia's financial difficulties, Congress restored him to the rank of General of the Army with full retirement pay—Grant's assumption of the presidency had required that he resign his commission and forfeit his (and his widow's) pension.

Grant was nearly penniless and worried about leaving his wife money to live on. He approached The Century Magazine and wrote a number of articles on his Civil War campaigns for $500 (equivalent to $18,000 in 2025) each. The articles were well received by critics, and the editor, Robert Underwood Johnson, suggested that Grant write a memoir, as Sherman and others had done. The magazine offered him a book contract with a 10% royalty. However, Grant's friend Mark Twain, one of the few who understood Grant's precarious financial condition, offered him an unheard-of 70% royalty. To provide for his family, Grant worked intensely on his memoirs in New York City. His former staff member Adam Badeau assisted with the research, while his son Frederick located documents and did much of the fact-checking. Because of the summer heat and humidity, his doctors recommended that he move upstate to a cottage at the top of Mount McGregor, offered by a family friend.

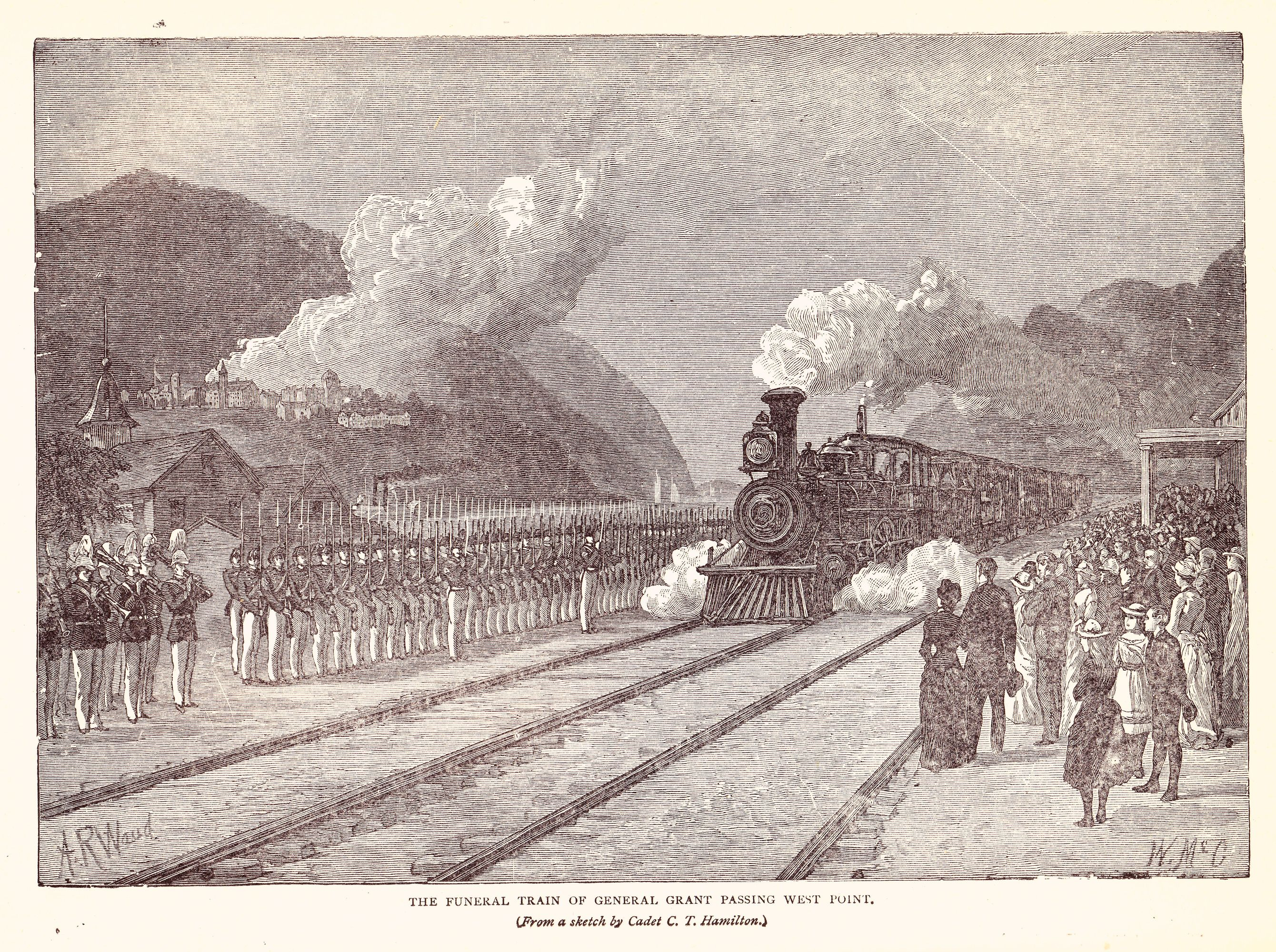
Grant's funeral train at West Point

On July 18, 1885, Grant finished his memoir, which includes the events of his life to the end of the Civil War. The Personal Memoirs of U. S. Grant was a critical and commercial success. Julia Grant eventually received about $450,000 in royalties (equivalent to $16,100,000 in 2025). The memoir has been highly regarded by the public, military historians, and literary critics. Grant portrayed himself as an honorable Western hero, whose strength lies in his honesty. He candidly depicted his battles against both the Confederates and internal army foes.

Grant died in the Mount McGregor cottage on July 23, 1885. Sheridan, then Commanding General of the Army, ordered a day-long tribute to Grant on all military posts, and President Grover Cleveland ordered a thirty-day nationwide period of mourning. After private services, the honor guard placed Grant's body on a funeral train, which traveled to West Point and New York City. A quarter of a million people viewed it in the two days before the funeral. Tens of thousands of men, many of them veterans from the Grand Army of the Republic (GAR), marched with Grant's casket drawn by two dozen black stallions to Riverside Park in Morningside Heights, Manhattan. His pallbearers included Union generals Sherman and Sheridan, Confederate generals Simon Bolivar Buckner and Joseph E. Johnston, Admiral David Dixon Porter, and Senator John A. Logan, the head of the GAR. Following the casket in the seven-mile-long (11 km) procession were President Cleveland, two former living presidents Hayes and Arthur, all of the president's cabinet, and justices of the Supreme Court.

Attendance at the New York funeral topped 1.5 million. Ceremonies were held in other major cities around the country, while Grant was eulogized in the press. Grant's body was laid to rest in Riverside Park, first in a temporary tomb, and then on April 17, 1897, in the General Grant National Memorial, known as "Grant's Tomb", the largest mausoleum in North America.

== Historical reputation ==
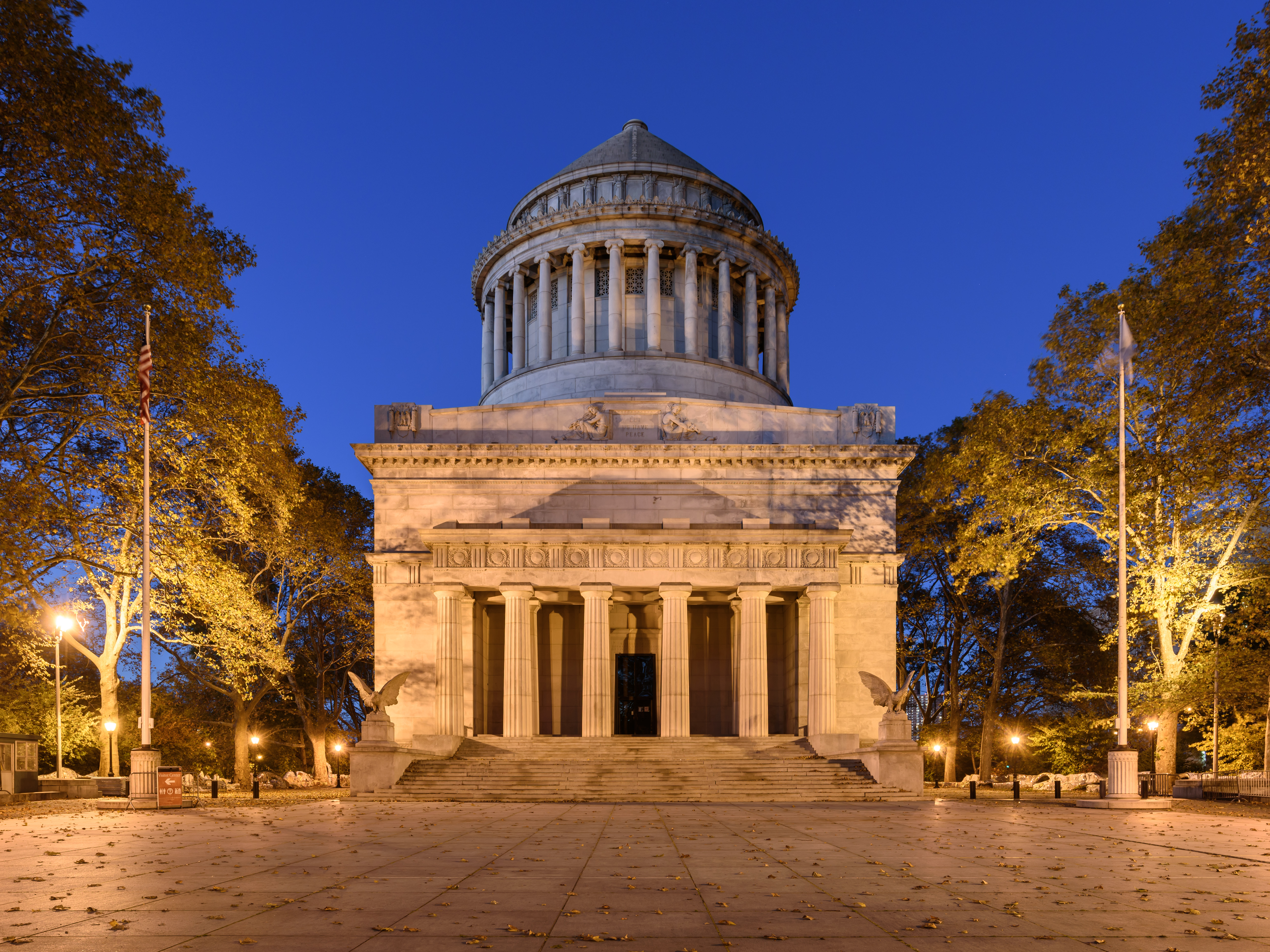
Grant's Tomb at dusk, 2016

Grant was hailed across the North as the general who "saved the Union", and overall, his military reputation has held up well. Achieving great national fame for his victories at Vicksburg and the surrender at Appomattox, Grant was the most successful general, Union or Confederate, in the American Civil War. He was criticized by the South for using excessive force, and his drinking was often exaggerated by the press and stereotyped by rivals and critics. Historians also debate how effective Grant was at halting corruption. The scandals during his administration stigmatized his political reputation. Despite his administration's scandals, Grant was still respected by most of the nation at the time of his death, as can be indicated by the praise from Democratic president Cleveland and even some former Confederate generals, two of whom had served as his pallbearers.

However, Grant's reputation would decline soon after his death. During the late 19th and early 20th centuries, Grant's reputation was damaged by the "Lost Cause" movement and the Dunning School. Grant's reputation particularly fell in the late 1910s and early 1920s because the U.S. deaths in World War I brought back memories of Union deaths in Virginia in 1864, and the scandals of the Warren Harding administration brought back memories of the Grant administration's scandals. Views of Grant reached new lows as he was seen as an unsuccessful president and an unskilled, if lucky, general. In the 1950s, some historians reassessed Grant's military career, shifting the analysis of Grant as the victor by brute force to that of a skillful modern strategist and commander. Historian William S. McFeely's biography, Grant (1981), won the Pulitzer Prize, and brought renewed scholarly interest in Grant. McFeely believed Grant was an "ordinary American" trying to "make his mark" during the 19th century. In the 21st century, Grant's reputation improved markedly among historians after the publication of Grant (2001), by historian Jean Edward Smith. Opinions of Grant's presidency demonstrate a better appreciation of Grant's personal integrity, Reconstruction efforts, and peace policy towards Indians, even when they fell short. H. W. Brands's The Man Who Saved the Union (2012), Ronald C. White's American Ulysses (2016), and Ron Chernow's Grant (2017) continued the elevation of Grant's reputation. White said that Grant "demonstrated a distinctive sense of humility, moral courage, and determination", and as president he "stood up for African Americans, especially fighting against voter suppression perpetrated by the Ku Klux Klan". White believed that Grant was "an exceptional person and leader". Historian Robert Farley writes that the "Cult of Lee" and the Dunning School's resentment of Grant for his defeat of Lee and his strong enforcement of Reconstruction resulted in Grant's shoddy treatment by early 20th-century historians.

In a 2021 C-SPAN survey ranking presidents from worst to best, Grant was ranked 20 out of 44 presidents, up from his previous ranking of 33 in 2017. This was due to the rehabilitation of his image and legacy in more recent years, with Grant now receiving "more credit for Reconstruction and his diplomacy than condemnation for his alleged corruption."

== Dates of rank ==
Ranks
Insignia	Rank	Date	Component
No insignia	Cadet, USMA	July 1, 1839	Regular Army
	Brevet second lieutenant	July 1, 1843	Regular Army
	Second lieutenant	September 30, 1845	Regular Army
	Brevet first lieutenant	September 8, 1847	Regular Army
	First lieutenant	September 16, 1847	Regular Army
	Captain	August 5, 1853	Regular Army (resigned July 31, 1854)
	Colonel	June 17, 1861	Volunteers
	Brigadier general	August 7, 1861	Volunteers (to rank from May 17, 1861)
	Major general	February 16, 1862	Volunteers
	Major general	July 4, 1863	Regular Army
	Lieutenant general	March 2, 1864	Regular Army
	General of the Army	July 25, 1866	Regular Army
No insignia	General of the Armies	April 19, 2024 (posthumous)	Regular Army

== See also ==
- List of American Civil War battles
- List of American Civil War generals (Union)
- List of presidents of the United States
- List of presidents of the United States by previous experience
- List of presidents of the United States who owned slaves

Military offices
Preceded by Henry Halleck	Commanding General of the U.S. Army; 1864–1869	Succeeded by William Tecumseh Sherman
Political offices
Preceded by Edwin Stanton	Acting United States Secretary of War; 1867–1868	Succeeded by Edwin Stanton
Preceded by Andrew Johnson	President of the United States; 1869–1877	Succeeded by Rutherford B. Hayes
Party political offices
Preceded by Abraham Lincoln	Republican nominee for President of the United States; 1868, 1872	Succeeded by Rutherford B. Hayes
National Rifle Association of America
Preceded by E. L. Molineux	President of the NRA; 1883–1884	Succeeded by Philip Sheridan
