= Bibliography of works on Ulysses S. Grant =

External videos
- Presentation by Ronald White to the White House Historical Association on American Ulysses: A Life of Ulysses S. Grant, October 5, 2016, C-SPAN
- Q&A interview with White on American Ulysses, December 4, 2016, C-SPAN
- Presentation by White at the National Book Festival on American Ulysses, September 2, 2017, C-SPAN
- Q&A interview with Ron Chernow on Grant, November 5, 2017, C-SPAN
- Panel discussion of Grant biographers Geoffrey Perret, John Y. Simon, Brooks Simpson, and Jean Edward Smith, moderated by James M. McPherson, June 25, 2001, C-SPAN

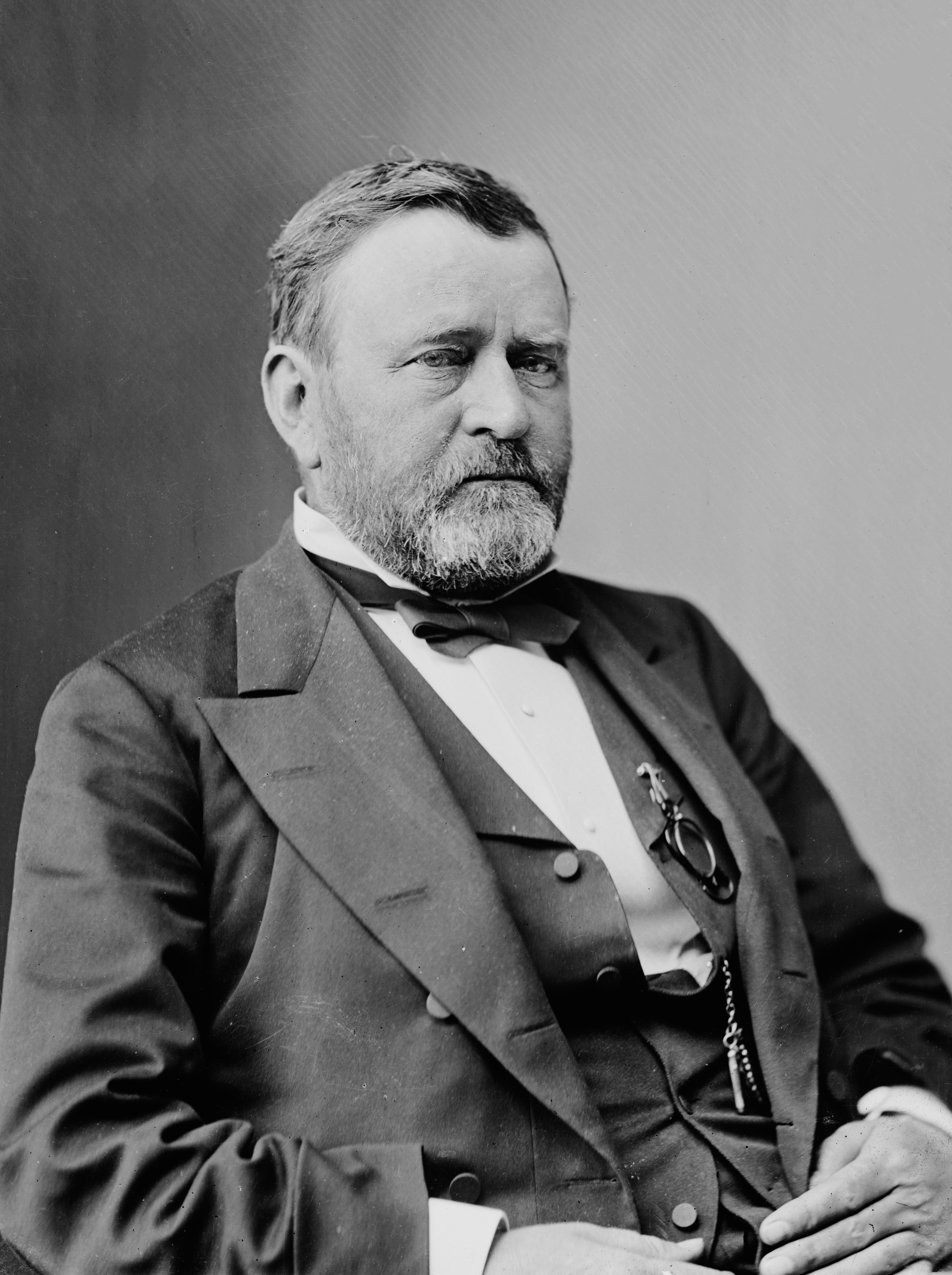
Portrait by Mathew Brady, c. 1870–1880

Ulysses S. Grant (born Hiram Ulysses Grant; April 27, 1822 – July 23, 1885) was the 18th president of the United States (1869–1877) following his success as military commander in the American Civil War. Under Grant, the Union Army defeated the Confederate military and secession, the war ending with the surrender of Robert E. Lee's army at Appomattox Court House. As president, Grant led the Radical Republicans in their effort to eliminate vestiges of Confederate nationalism and slavery, protect African American citizenship, and pursued Reconstruction in the former Confederate states. In foreign policy, Grant sought to increase American trade and influence, while remaining at peace with the world. Although his Republican Party split in 1872 as reformers denounced him, Grant was easily reelected. During his second term the country's economy was devastated by the Panic of 1873, while investigations exposed corruption scandals in the administration. Although still below average, his reputation among scholars has significantly improved in recent years because of greater appreciation for his commitment to civil rights, moral courage in his prosecution of the Ku Klux Klan, and enforcement of voting rights.

There are abundant historical resources on Grant and his role during the Civil War and thereafter. However, there have been few historical scholarly studies on his presidency, and, until recently, they were mostly negative. Analysis of Grant's presidency by some modern scholars, including Grant biographers Jean Edward Smith (2001), H. W. Brands (2012), Ron Chernow (2017), and Charles W. Calhoun (2017), have generally been more positive about Grant's presidency. Encyclopedic presidential summary biographies of Grant rely heavily on secondary sources and tend to offer non-scholarly negative views of Grant. One bibliographical source recommends that, to obtain a more complete assessment of Grant and his presidency during Reconstruction, one read contemporary, primary, and scholarly accounts of Grant, his inaugural addresses, and his communications and annual messages to Congress. In May 2012, on the 50th anniversary of the founding of the Ulysses S. Grant Foundation, Mississippi State University was selected as the permanent location for Ulysses S. Grant's Presidential Library. Historian John Y. Simon edited Grant's letters into a 32-volume scholarly edition published by Southern Illinois University Press.

For a comprehensive scholarly annotated bibliography covering several thousand books, articles, and archival sources see Marie Ellen Kelsey, ed. Ulysses S. Grant: A Bibliography: A Bibliography (2005). online

== Biographical and political ==
- Abbott, John Stevens Cabot (1872). The Life of General Ulysses S. Grant. Boston: B. B. Russell.
- Anbinder, Tyler (June 1997). "Ulysses S. Grant, Nativist". Civil War History. 43 (2): 119–141. doi:10.1353/cwh.1997.0086. S2CID 144527425.
- Badeau, Adam (1887). Grant in Peace: From Appomattox to Mount McGregor. New York: D.Appleton. ISBN 978-0836957235.
- Brands, H. W. (2012). The Man Who Saved The Union: Ulysses S. Grant in War and Peace. New York: Doubleday. ISBN 978-0385532426.
- Brands, H. W. (2012). "Presidents in Crisis Grant: Takes on the Klan". American History: 42–47.
- Brisbin, General James S. (1868). The campaign lives of Ulysses S. Grant, and Schyler Colfax. C. F. Vent & Company, Cincinnati.
- Broadwater, Robert P. (2012). Ulysses S. Grant: A Biography. ABC-CLIO. ISBN 978-0-3133-9255-9.
- Brown, E. E. (1885). Life of Ulysses Simpson Grant. D. Lothrop & Company.
- Burr, Frank A.; Newman, John Philip (1885). A new, original and authentic record of the life and deeds of General U. S. Grant. Empyreal publishing house.
- Bunting III, Josiah (2004). Ulysses S. Grant. New York: Times Books. ISBN 0-8050-6949-6.
- Cadwallader, Sylvanus (1955). Three years with Grant, as recalled by war correspondent Sylvanus Cadwallader. Knopf Publishers, New York. ISBN 978-0-8032-6369-7.
- Calhoun, Charles W. (2017). The Presidency of Ulysses S. Grant. University Press of Kansas, Lawrence. ISBN 978-0-7006-2484-3. scholarly review and response by Calhoun at doi:10.14296/RiH/2014/2270
- Carpenter, John A. (1970). Ulysses S. Grant. Twayne Publishers, New York. {eBook}
- Chernow, Ron (2017). Grant. Penguin Books. ISBN 978-0-5255-2195-2.
- Church, William Conant (1897). Ulysses S. Grant and the period of national preservation and reconstruction. G.P. Putnam's Sons, New York. (e'Book)
- Clarke, O. P. (1895). General Grant at Mount MacGregor. Cozzens & Waterbury. (e'Book)
- Coolidge, Louis (1917). Ulysses S. Grant. Houghton Mifflin Co., Boston & New York. ISBN 9780404508944.
- Conger, Arthur Latham (1931). The Rise of U.S. Grant. Century Company.
- Corning, Amos Elwood (1918). Hamilton Fish. The Lanmere publishing co.
- Cox, Jacob Dolson (July 1, 1895). "How Judge Hoar Ceased to be Attorney General". Atlantic Monthly Making of America. 76 (454). Cornell University Library: 162–173.
- Crafts, William August (1868). Life of Ulysses S. Grant: His Boyhood, Campaigns, and Services, Military and Civil. Samuel Walker and Company.
- Cross, Nelson (1872). The Modern Ulysses, LL. D.: His Political Record. J. S. Redfield.
- Dowdall, Denise M (2013). From Cincinnati to the Colorado Ranger: The Horsemanship of Ulysses S. Grant. BookBaby. ISBN 978-0-9574-0213-3.
- Dunning, William (1905). Reconstruction Political and Economic 1865–1877. Vol. 22.
- Edmonds, Franklin Spencer (1915). Ulysses S. Grant. George W. Jacobs, Publishers, Philadelphia.
- Charles, Ellington (1987). The Trial of U.S. Grant: The Pacific Coast Years, 1852–1854. A.H. Clark Company. ISBN 978-0-8706-2169-7.
- Fairman, Charles (1971). Reconstruction and Reunion, 1864–88. Macmillan. ISBN 978-0025369108.
- Felton, Franklin Eliot (1870). The Secrets of Internal Revenue: Exposing the Whiskey Ring, Gold Ring, and Drawback Frauds. William Flint, philadelphia.
- Flood, Charles Bracelen (2005). Grant and Sherman: The Friendship That Won the Civil War. New York: Harper Perennial. ISBN 0-06-114871-7.
- —— (2011). Grant's Final Victory: Ulysses S. Grant's Heroic Last Year. Da Capo Press. ISBN 978-0-3068-2056-4.
- Foner, Eric (2002) [1988]. Reconstruction: America's Unfinished Revolution, 1863–1877. Harper Collins (original publisher: Harper & Row). ISBN 978-0-0609-3716-4.
- Frantz, Edward O. (2014). A Companion to the Reconstruction Presidents 1865–1881. Chichester, West Sussex, United Kingdom: John Wiley & Sons, Inc. ISBN 978-1-4443-3928-4.
- Grant, Julia Dent; Simon, John Y. (1988). The Personal Memoirs of Julia Dent Grant (Mrs. Ulysses S. Grant). SIU Press. ISBN 978-0-8093-1443-0.
- Garland, Hamlin (1898). Ulysses S. Grant: His Life and Character. New York: Doubleday & McClure Co.
- Hardy, William E. (2008). "South of the Border: Ulysses S. Grant and the French Intervention". Civil War History. 54 (1): 63–86. doi:10.1353/cwh.2008.0008. S2CID 144122281. Archived from the original on December 2, 2008 – via Questia.
- Headley, Joel Tyler (1872). The Life of Ulysses S. Grant. K. B. Treat Publishing, New York.
- —— (1879). The Life and Travels of General Grant. Hubbard Bros, Philadelphia.
- Hesseltine, William B. (1957) [1935]. Ulysses S. Grant: Politician. New York: F. Ungar Pub. Co. ISBN 1-931313-85-7.
- Howland, Edward (1868). Grant as a soldier and statesman [electronic resource] : being a succinct history of his military and civil career. Hartford, J.B. Burr & Company.
- Kelsey, Marie Ellen (2005). Ulysses S. Grant: A Bibliography. ABC-CLIO. ISBN 978-0-3130-8327-3.
- King, Charles (1914). The True Ulysses S. Grant. J. B. Lippincott Company, Philadelphia & London.
- Kohn, George C. (2000). The New Encyclopedia of American Scandal. New York: Facts On File, Inc. ISBN 0-8160-4420-1.
- Kreiser, Christine (2013). "Royal Visit". American History. 47 (6): 19.
- Larke, Julian K. (1868). The life, Campaigns and Battles of General Ulysses S. Grant, comprising a full and authentic account of the famous soldier, from his earliest boyhood to the present time. New York, Ledyard Bill; Chicago, Charles Bill.
- —— (1879). General U. S. Grant: His Early Life and Military Career, with a brief account of his presidential administration and tour around the world. W. J. Johnston, New York, 528 pp.
- Longacre, Edward G. (2006). General Ulysses S. Grant The Soldier And The Man. Cambridge, Massachusetts: First Da Capo Press. ISBN 0-306-81269-X.
- Mackowski, Chris, and Scaturro, Frank J., eds. (2023). Grant at 200: Reconsidering the Life and Legacy of Ulysses S. Grant. El Dorado Hills, California: Savas Beatie. ISBN 978-1-61121-614-1.
- Mansfield, Edward Deering (1868). A Popular and Authentic Life of Ulysses S. Grant. R. W. Carroll & Co.
- —— (1868). A popular and authentic life of Ulysses S. Grant. R.W. Carroll & Co.
- Mantell, Martin E. (1973). Johnson, Grant, and the Politics of Reconstruction. New York: Columbia University Press. Archived from the original on August 16, 2011 – via Questia.
- Martinez, James Michael (2007). Carpetbaggers, Cavalry, and the Ku Klux Klan: Exposing the Invisible Empire During Reconstruction. Rowman & Littlefield. ISBN 978-0-7425-5078-0.
- Marshall, Edward Chauncey (1869). The ancestry of General Grant, and their contemporaries. Sheldon & Company, New York.
- McDonald, John (1880). Secrets of the great whiskey ring; and Eighteen months in the penitentiary. St. Louis, Mo., W. S. Bryan.
- McFeely, William S. (1974). Woodward, C. Vann (ed.). Responses of the Presidents to Charges of Misconduct. New York: Delacorte Press. ISBN 0-440-05923-2.
- —— (1981). Grant: A Biography. Norton. ISBN 0-393-01372-3.; Pulitzer Prize
- Nevins, Allan (1957) [1936]. Hamilton Fish: The Inner History of the Grant Administration, Volume I. New York: Dodd, Mead. ISBN 978-0804416764.
- —— (1957) [1936]. Hamilton Fish: The Inner History of the Grant Administration, Volume II. New York: Dodd, Mead.
- Patrick, Rembert W. (1968). The Reconstruction of the Nation. New York: Oxford University Press.
- Perret, Geoffrey (1997). Ulysses S. Grant: Soldier & President. New York: Random House. ISBN 978-0307560889.
- —— (2004). Grant and Twain. New York: Random House. ISBN 978-0679642732.
- Picone, Louis L. (2021). Grant's Tomb: The Epic Death of Ulysses S. Grant and the Making of an American Pantheon. Rye, New York: Arcade.
- Rable, George C. (2007). But There Was No Peace: The Role of Violence in the Politics of Reconstruction. Athens: University of Georgia Press. ISBN 978-0820330112.
- Reeves, John (2023). Soldier of Destiny: Slavery, Secession, and the Redemption of Ulysses S. Grant. New York: Pegasus Books.
- Remlap, L.T. (1879). General U. S. Grant's tour around the world : embracing his speeches, receptions, and description of his travels : with a biographical sketch of his life. James Betts publishers.
- Renehan, A; Lowry, J C (1995). "The oral tumours of two American presidents: what if they were alive today?". J R Soc Med. 88 (7): 377–383. PMC 1295266. PMID 7562805.
- Richardson, Albert Deane (1868). A personal history of Ulysses S. Grant. American Publishing Company, Hartford, CT. ( (Alternative eBook)
- —— (1867). 'Beyond the Mississippi, From the Great River to the Great Ocean. American Publishing Company; Hartford, CT. (reprint edition, 1967, by Johnson Reprint Corp, ISBN 0-384-50670-4 )
- Rhodes, James Ford (1920). History of the United States from the Compromise of 1850 to the McKinley-Bryan Campaign of 1896. Vol. 6 & 7. Archived from the original on May 15, 2012 – via Questia.
- Ross, Ishbel (2016). The General's Wife: The Life of Mrs. Ulysses S. Grant. Pickle Partners Publishing. ISBN 978-1786258540.
- Sarna, Jonathan (2012). When General Grant Expelled the Jews. New York: Nextbook Press. ISBN 978-0-8052-4279-9.
- Scaturro, Frank J. (1998). President Grant Reconsidered. Lanham, Maryland: University Press of America. ISBN 978-0761810780.
- Schmiel, Eugene D. (2014). Citizen-General: Jacob Dolson Cox and the Civil War Era. Athens: Ohio University Press. ISBN 978-0-8214-2082-9.
- Simpson, Brooks D. (1991). Let Us Have Peace: Ulysses S. Grant and the Politics of War and Reconstruction, 1861–1868. Chapel Hill: University of North Carolina Press. ISBN 978-0700608966.
- Simpson, Brooks D. (1998). The Reconstruction Presidents. Lawrence: University Press of Kansas. ISBN 978-0700608966.
- Simpson, Brooks D. (2000). Ulysses S. Grant: Triumph Over Adversity, 1822–1865. Boston, Massachusetts: Houghton Mifflin. ISBN 0-395-65994-9.
- Simon, John Y. (2002). "Ulysses S. Grant". In Graff, Henry (ed.). The Presidents: A Reference History (7th ed.). ISBN 978-0684312262.
- Smith, Jean Edward (2001). Grant. New York: Simon & Schuster. ISBN 0-684-84927-5.
- Stoddard, William Osborn (1886). Ulysses S. Grant. White, Stokes, & Allen, New York.
- Tatum, Lawrie (1970) [1899]. Our red brothers and the peace policy of President Ulysses S. Grant. Lincoln: University of Nebraska Press.
- Thayer, William M. (1885). From Tannery to the White House: The Life of Ulysses S. Grant : His Boyhood, Youth, Manhood, Public and Private Life and Services. James H. Earle, Boston.
- Thomas M., Pitkin (2010). The Captain Departs: Ulysses S. Grant's Last Campaign. Southern Illinois University Press. ISBN 978-0-8093-8611-6.
- Unger, Irwin (2015) [1968]. Greenback Era. Princeton University Press. ISBN 978-1-4008-7766-9.
- Venable, Shannon L. (2011). Gold: A Cultural Encyclopedia. Santa Barbara, California: ABC-CLIO LLC. ISBN 978-0-313-38430-1.
- Waltmann, Henry G. (1971). "Circumstantial Reformer: President Grant & the Indian Problem". Arizona and the West. 13 (4): 323–342. JSTOR 40168089.
- Waugh, Joan (2009). U.S. Grant: American Hero, American Myth. The University of North Carolina Press. ISBN 978-0-8078-3317-9.
- White, Ronald C. (2016). American Ulysses: A Life of Ulysses S. Grant. Random House Publishing Group. ISBN 978-1-5883-6992-5.
- Wister, Owen (1900). Ulysses S. Grant. George H. Ellis, Boston.
- Woodward, William E. (1931). Meet General Grant, Garden Publishing Company, (Original from University of Virginia Press), 524 pp.
- Woodward, C. Vann (April 1957). "The Lowest Ebb". American Heritage. 8 (3): 53–108. Archived from the original on January 6, 2009.

== Military ==
- Badeau, Adam (1881). Military History of Ulysses S. Grant, from April 1861, to April 1865. New York: D. Appleton.
- Ballard, Michael B. (2013). Grant at Vicksburg: The General and the Siege. Southern Illinois University Press.
- Bearss, Edwin C. (1991). The Vicksburg Campaign. Dayton, Ohio: Morningside. ISBN 0-89029-308-2.
- Boyd, James Penny (1885). Military and civil life of Gen. Ulysses S. Grant. Philadelphia and Chicago: P.W. Ziegler & Co., 754 pages., Google eBook
- Catton, Bruce (1954). U.S. Grant and the American Military Tradition. Boston: Little, Brown. ISBN 978-1504024228.
- —— (1956). This Hallowed Ground: A History of the Civil War. New York: Vintage Books. ISBN 978-0-307-94708-6.
- —— (1960). Grant Moves South. Boston: Little, Brown. ISBN 0-316-13207-1.
- —— (1968). Grant Takes Command. Boston: Little, Brown. ISBN 0-316-13210-1.
- Crummer, Wilbur F. (1915). With Grant at Fort Donelson, Shiloh and Vicksburg. E. C. Crummer & Co.
- Commager, Henry Steele, ed. (1950). The Blue and the Gray: The Story of the Civil War as Told by Participants. Bobbs-Merrill.
- Coppée, Henry (1866). Grant and his campaigns : a military biography. New York: C.B. Richardson; Cincinnati: C.F. Vent.
- Davis, Burke (2016). To Appomattox: Nine April Days, 1865. Open Road Media. ISBN 978-1-5040-3442-5.
- Davis, William C. (2014). Crucible of Command. Da Capo Press. ISBN 978-0-306-82245-2.
- Deming, Henry Champion (1868). The life of Ulysses S. Grant, general United States Army. S.S. Scranton & Co., 562 pp..
- DiNunzio, Mario R. (Winter 1973). "Lyman Trumbull, the States' Rights Issue, and the Liberal Republican Revolt". Journal of the Illinois State Historical Society. 66 (4): 364–375. JSTOR 40190731.
- Donovan, James (2008). A Terrible Glory Custer and the Little Bighorn – The Last Great Battle of the American West. New York: Back Ray Books. ISBN 978-0-316-06747-8.
- Dorsett, Lyle W. "The Problem of Ulysses S. Grant’s Drinking During the Civil War," Hayes Historical Journal vol. 4, no. 2 (1983): 37–49. online
- Farina, William (2007). Ulysses S. Grant, 1861–1864: His Rise from Obscurity to Military Greatness. Jefferson, North Carolina: McFarland & Co. ISBN 978-0-7864-2977-6.
- Flood, Charles Bracelen (2005). Grant and Sherman The Friendship That Won The Civil War. New York: Harper Perennial. ISBN 0-06-114871-7.
- Foote, Shelby (1958). The Civil War: A Narrative, Fort Sumter to Perryville, Vol. 1. Random House.
- —— (1963). The Civil War: A Narrative, Fredericksburg to Meridian, Vol. 2. Random House. ISBN 978-0307290434.
- —— (1974). The Civil War: A Narrative, Red River to Appomattox, Vol. 3. Random House. ISBN 978-0394465128.
- Friedman, Norman (1985). U.S. Battleships: An Illustrated Design History. Annapolis, MD: United States Naval Institute. ISBN 978-0-87021-715-9.
- Fuller, Maj. Gen. J. F. C. (1957). Grant and Lee, a Study in Personality and Generalship. Bloomington: Indiana University Press. ISBN 0-253-13400-5.
- —— (1991). The Generalship of Ulysses S. Grant. Da Capo Press. p. 446. ISBN 978-0-3068-0450-2.
- Groom, Winston (2009). Vicksburg, 1863. New York: Alfred A. Knopf. ISBN 978-0-3072-7677-3.
- —— (2012). Shiloh 1862. National Geographic Books. ISBN 978-1-4262-0879-9.
- Kantor, MacKinlay, 2007. Lee and Grant at Appomattox, Sterling Publishing Company, ISBN 978-1-402-7512-40
- Hurst, Jack (2008). Men of Fire: Grant, Forrest, and the Campaign That Decided the Civil War. Basic Books. ISBN 978-0-4650-0847-6.
- —— (2012). Born to Battle. Basic Books. ISBN 978-0-4650-2018-8.
- Korda, Michael (2004). Ulysses S. Grant: The Unlikely Hero. New York: Atlas Books/HarperCollins. ISBN 978-0060590154.
- Korn, Bertram W. (1951). American Jewry and the Civil War. New York: Jewish Publication Society of America.
- Lewis, Lloyd (1950). Captain Sam Grant. Boston: Little, Brown. ISBN 0-316-52348-8.
- McCormick, Robert R. (1934). Ulysses S. Grant The Great Soldier of America. New York: D. Appleton-Century Company.
- McWhiney, Grady (1995). Battle in the Wilderness: Grant Meets Lee. Fort Worth, Texas: Ryan Place Publishers.
- Lowry, Don (1995). Towards an Indefinite Shore: The Final Months of the Civil War, December 1864–May 1865. Hippocrene Books. ISBN 978-0-7818-0422-6.
- McDonough, James Lee (1977). Shiloh: In Hell Before Night. Knoxville: University of Tennessee Press.
- McDonough, James Lee (1984). Chattanooga: A Death Grip on the Confederacy. Knoxville: University of Tennessee Press. ISBN 978-0870496301.
- McPherson, James M. (1988). Battle Cry of Freedom: The Civil War Era. New York: Oxford University Press. ISBN 0-19-503863-0.
- McPherson; Robertson; Sears; Symonds; Waugh (2011). Hearts Touched by Fire. The Modern Library, New York. ISBN 978-0-6796-0430-3.
- Maney, R. Wayne (1994). Marching to Cold Harbor. Victory and Failure, 1864. Shippensburg, Pennsylvania: White Mane Pub. Co.
- Matter, William D. (1988). If It Takes All Summer: The Battle of Spotsylvania. Chapel Hill: University of North Carolina Press.
- Miers, Earl Schenck (1955). The Web of Victory: Grant at Vicksburg. New York: Knopf. ISBN 978-0807111994.
- Mosier, John (2006). Grant. New York: Palgrave MacMillan. ISBN 1-4039-7136-6.; received negative reviews
- Nevins, Allan. The War for the Union (4 vol 1959–71), comprehensive coverage of all aspects of the war.
- Rhea, Gordon C. (1994). The Battle of the Wilderness May 5–6, 1864. Louisiana State University Press. ISBN 0-8071-1873-7.
- —— (1997). The Battles for Spotsylvania Court House and the Road to Yellow Tavern May 7–12, 1864. Louisiana State University Press. ISBN 0-8071-2136-3.
- —— (2000). To the North Anna River: Grant and Lee, May 13–25, 1864. Louisiana State University Press. ISBN 0-8071-2535-0.
- —— (2002). Cold Harbor: Grant and Lee, May 26 – June 3, 1864. Louisiana State University Press. ISBN 0-8071-2803-1.
- Pratt, Fletcher (1956). Civil War on Western Waters. Holt.
- Schenker, Carl R. (June 2010). "Ulysses in His Tent: Halleck, Grant, Sherman, and 'The Turning Point of the War'". Civil War History. 56 (2).
- Silkenat, David. Raising the White Flag: How Surrender Defined the American Civil War. Chapel Hill: University of North Carolina Press, 2019. ISBN 978-1-4696-4972-6.
- Simpson, Brooks D. (2009). After Shiloh: Grant, Sherman, and Survival. Carbondale: Southern Illinois University Press.
- Smith, Gene O. (1989). Lee and Grant: A Dual Biography. Promontory Press. ISBN 978-0-8839-4073-0.
- Smith, Timothy B. (2013). Rethinking Shiloh: Myth and Memory. Univ. of Tennessee Press. ISBN 978-1-5723-3988-0.
- Stansfield, F.W.H. (1864). The life of Gen'l U.S. Grant, the General in Chief of the United States Army. New York : T.R. Dawley.
- Steere, Edward (1960). The Wilderness Campaign. Harrisburg, Pennsylvania: Stackpole Co.
- Varney, Frank P. (2013). General Grant and the Rewriting of History. California: Savas Beatie. ISBN 978-1-61121-118-4.
- Tucker, Spencer C., ed. (2013). The Encyclopedia of the Mexican-American War: A Political, Social, and Military History. Vol. 1. Santa Barbara, California: ABC-CLIO. ISBN 978-1-85109-853-8.
- Williams, Kenneth P. (1985). Lincoln Finds a General: A Military Study of the Civil War. Vol. 1. New York: Nacmilian Press.
- —— (1949). Lincoln Finds a General: A Military Study of the Civil War. Vol. 2. New York: Macmilian Press.
- —— (1949). Lincoln Finds a General: A Military Study of the Civil War. Vol. 3. New York: Macmilian Press.
- —— (1985). Lincoln Finds a General: A Military Study of the Civil War. Vol. 4. New York: Macmilian Press.
- —— (1949). Lincoln Finds a General: A Military Study of the Civil War. Vol. 5. New York: Macmillan Press.
- Williams, T. Harry (1962). McClellan, Sherman and Grant. New Brunswick, New Jersey: Rutgers University Press. ISBN 978-1461731368.
- Wilson, James Harrison; Dana, Charles Anderson (1868). The Life of Ulysses S. Grant: General of the Armies of the United States. Gurdon Bill & Co.; H.C . Johnson.
- Wilson, James Grant (1868). The life and campaigns of Ulysses Simpson Grant, general-in-chief of the United States army. New York, R.M. De Witt.
- —— (1916). The life of John A. Rawlins, lawyer, assistant adjutant-general, chief of staff, major general of volunteers, and secretary of war. The Neale Publishing Company.
- Woodworth, Steven E. (2005). Nothing but Victory: The Army of the Tennessee, 1861–1865. New York: Alfred A. Knopf. ISBN 0-375-41218-2.

== Grant's memoirs, two-volume work ==
(Many editions in paper and online; ends in 1865)

=== Two-volume work ===
- Personal memoirs of U.S. Grant, Vol I, C.L. Webster, 1885
- Personal memoirs of U.S. Grant, Vol II, C.L. Webster, 1885

Other formats

- Grant, Ulysses S. (1885). Personal Memoirs of U.S. Grant, Part I. Charles L. Webster & Co.
- Grant, Ulysses S. (1885). Personal Memoirs of U.S. Grant, Part II. Charles L. Webster & Co.
- Grant, Ulysses S. (1885). Personal Memoirs of U.S. Grant, Part III. Charles L. Webster & Co.
- Grant, Ulysses S. (1885). Personal Memoirs of U.S. Grant, Part IV. Charles L. Webster & Co.
- Grant, Ulysses S. (1885). Personal Memoirs of U.S. Grant, Part V. Charles L. Webster & Co.
- Grant, Ulysses S. (1885). Personal Memoirs of U.S. Grant, Part VI. Charles L. Webster & Co.

• • •

- Grant, Ulysses S. (1885). Personal Memoirs of U.S. Grant, Complete. Charles L. Webster & Co.

Early biographers (and memoirs of close associates)

- Badeau, Adam (1887). Grant in Peace. From Appomattox to Mount McGregor. A Personal Memoir. Hartford: S. S. Scranton & Co.

== Primary sources ==
Inaugural Addresses

- 1869 Inaugural Address – Ulysses S. Grant
- 1873 Inaugural Address – Ulysses S. Grant

State of the Union Addresses

- 1869 State of the Union Message – Ulysses S. Grant
- 1870 State of the Union Message – Ulysses S. Grant
- 1871 State of the Union Message – Ulysses S. Grant
- 1872 State of the Union Message – Ulysses S. Grant
- 1873 State of the Union Message – Ulysses S. Grant
- 1874 State of the Union Message – Ulysses S. Grant
- 1875 State of the Union Message – Ulysses S. Grant
- 1876 State of the Union Message – Ulysses S. Grant

Executive orders

- Executive Orders 1869 - Ulysses S. Grant
- Executive Orders 1870 - Ulysses S. Grant
- Executive Orders 1871 - Ulysses S. Grant
- Executive Orders 1872 - Ulysses S. Grant
- Executive Orders 1873 - Ulysses S. Grant
- Executive Orders 1874 - Ulysses S. Grant
- Executive Orders 1875 - Ulysses S. Grant
- Executive Orders 1876 - Ulysses S. Grant

Proclamations

- Proclamations 1869 - Ulysses S. Grant
- Proclamations 1870 - Ulysses S. Grant
- Proclamations 1871 - Ulysses S. Grant
- Proclamations 1872 - Ulysses S. Grant
- Proclamations 1873 - Ulysses S. Grant
- Proclamations 1874 - Ulysses S. Grant
- Proclamations 1875 - Ulysses S. Grant
- Proclamations 1876 - Ulysses S. Grant
- Proclamations 1877 - Ulysses S. Grant

Special Messages

- The American Presidency Project Document Archive Option 1: Search

1. President Ulysses S. Grant
2. Dates: March 4, 1869 to March 3, 1877
3. Document Category: Written Messages - To Congress

Civil Service Commission

- Ulysses S. Grant Executive Order April 16, 1872

Civil Rights Act of 1875

- An act to protect all citizens in their civil and legal rights. Library of Congress Statutes at Large 43rd Congress, 2nd Session, Volume 18, Part 3 pages 335-337

Veto Messages

- The American Presidency Project Document Archive Option 1: Search

1. President Ulysses S. Grant
2. Dates: March 4, 1869, to March 3, 1877
3. Document Category: Veto Messages - To Congress

Treaty of Washington 1871

- Treaty of Washington 1871 from Archive.org

Indian Appropriations Act 1871

- An Act making Appropriations for the current and contingent Expenses of the Indian Department, and for fulfilling Treaty Stipulations with Various Indian Tribes, for the Year ending June 30, eighteen hundred and seventy-two, and for other Purposes March 3, 1871

Papers of Ulysses S. Grant

- Grant, Ulysses (1912). Cramer, Jesse Grant (ed.). Letters of Ulysses S. Grant to his Father and his Youngest Sister, 1857-78. G. P. Putnam's Sons, Knickerbocker Press, New York, London.
- John Y., Simon (1967–2009). "The Papers of Ulysses S. Grant". Mississippi State University Online Edition. Archived from the original on October 13, 2016.
- —— (1991). The Papers of Ulysses S. Grant: October 1, 1867-June 30, 1868. SIU Press. ISBN 978-0-8093-1693-9.
- Cramer, Jesse Grant; Grant, Ulysses S. (1912). Letters of Ulysses S. Grant to his father and his youngest sister, 1857-78. J.P. Putnam and Sons, New York. ISBN 9781623768607.

Military accounts

- Grant, Ulysses S. (1885). Personal Memoirs of U.S. Grant. C.L. Webster & Co.; many editions in paper and online; ends in 1865
- Grant, Ulysses S. (1865). illustrated life, campaigns and public services of Lieut. General Grant : the hero of Fort Donelson! Vicksburg! ... : with a full history of his life, campaigns, and battles ... Philadelphia : T.B. Peterson & Brothers.
- Dana, Charles Anderson (1909). Recollections of the Civil War. D. Appleton and Company.

Grant's world tour

- Remlap, L. T. (1885). The life of General U.S. Grant, his early life, military achievements, and history of his civil administration, his sickness and death, together with his tour around the world. Chicago, Fairbanks & Palmer Pub. Co.
- Young, John Russell (1879). Around the world with General Grant. Vol. v.1. The American news co.
- —— (1879). Around the world with General Grant. Vol. v.2. The American news co.

== Historiography ==
- Arnold, Matthew. General Grant by Matthew Arnold with a Rejoinder by Mark Twain. Kent, Ohio, and London: The Kent State University Press, 1995 (on Grant's Memoirs)
- Bonekemper III, Edward H. (2004). A Victor, Not a Butcher: Ulysses S. Grant's Overlooked Military Genius. Washington, DC: Regnery. ISBN 0-89526-062-X.
- Bonekemper III, Edward H. (April 2011). "The butcher's bill: Ulysses S. Grant is often referred to as a 'butcher,' but does Robert E. Lee actually deserve that title?". Civil War Times. 52 (1): 36–43.
- Foner, Eric (November 2, 2012). "'The Man Who Saved the Union: Ulysses Grant in War and Peace' by H. W. Brands (book review)". The Washington Post. Archived from the original on April 13, 2013.
- Hackett, Frank Warren (1911). "Chapter III: The Alabama Claims – The Treaty of Washington". Reminiscences of the Geneva Tribunal of Arbitration, 1872, the Alabama Claims. New York: Houghton Mifflin. pp. 45–50. OCLC 2621753.
- Grant, Ulysses S. (1990). McFeely, Mary Drake; McFeely, William S. (eds.). Memoirs and Selected Letters. The Library of America. ISBN 978-0-940450-58-5.
- Marszalek, John F.; Nolen, David S.; Gallo, Louie P.; Williams, Frank J. (2019). Hold On With a Bullldog Grip: A Short Study of Ulysses S. Grant. Jackson: University Press of Mississippi.
- Martinez, J. Michael (March 15, 2021). "Scoundrels: Political Scandals in American History – Scandals of the 1870s".
- McPherson, Edward (1880) [First published 1871]. "Chapter LIII: XVth Amendment, Votes on Ratification, Proclamation of Ratification, Bills Enforcing and Votes Thereon". The Political History of the United States of America During the Period of Reconstruction. Washington, D.C.: Chapman. p. 545. ISBN 1-4255-6744-4. OCLC 492311406.
- Murray, Robert K.; Blessing, Tim H. (2004). Greatness in the White House. Pennsylvania State University Press. ISBN 0271038276.
- Paxson, Frederic Logan; Bach, Christian A. (1931). "Ulysses S. Grant". Dictionary of American Biography. Vol. VII. New York: C. Scribner's Sons. pp. 492–501.
- Picone, Louis L. (2021). Grant's Tomb: The Epic Death of Ulysses S. Grant and the Making of an American Pantheon. New York: Arcade Publishing.
- Porter, Horace (1897). Campaigning with Grant. Alexandria, Virginia: Time-Life Books.
- Rafuse, Ethan S. (July 2007). "Still a Mystery? General Grant and the Historians, 1981–2006". Journal of Military History. 71 (3): 849–874. doi:10.1353/jmh.2007.0230. S2CID 159901226.
- Russell, Henry M. W. (Spring 1990). "The memoirs of Ulysses S. Grant: The rhetoric of judgment". Virginia Quarterly Review. 66 (2): 189–209.
- Simon, John Y. (1982). "Grant: A Biography by William S. McFeely". The Wisconsin Magazine of History. 65 (3): 220–221. JSTOR 4635640. (book review)
- Simpson, Brooks D. (2000). "Continuous Hammering and Mere Attrition: Lost Cause Critics and the Military Reputation of Ulysses S. Grant". In Gallagher, Gary W.; Nolan, Alan T. (eds.). The Myth of the Lost Cause and Civil War History. Bloomington: Indiana University Press. ISBN 0-253-33822-0.
- Skidmore, Max J. (February 2005). "The Presidency of Ulysses S. Grant: A Reconsideration". White House Studies. 5 (2): 255–270.
- Weigley, Russell F. (October 2001). "Grant by Jean Edward Smith (book review)". The Journal of Military History. 65 (4): 1104–1105. doi:10.2307/2677657. JSTOR 2677657.
- Wilentz, Sean (March 14, 2010). "Who's Buried in the History Books?". The New York Times.
- Wilson, Edmund (1962). Patriotic Gore: Studies in the Literature of the American Civil War. New York: Oxford University Press. pp. 131–173.
- Young, John Russell (July–October 1880). "Around the World with General Grant". Quarterly Review. 150 (126). New York: Leonard Scott Publishing Company: 126.
- Zimmerman, Jonathan (November 12, 2010). "Why should we pay our ex-presidents?". Chicago Tribune.

== List of articles for Ulysses S. Grant ==
- Ulysses S. Grant
- Early life and career of Ulysses S. Grant
- Ulysses S. Grant and the American Civil War
- Commanding generalship of Ulysses S. Grant
- Presidency of Ulysses S. Grant
- 1868 United States presidential election
- 1872 United States presidential election
- 1876 United States presidential election
- Black Friday (1869)
- Scandals of the Ulysses S. Grant administration
- Reforms of the Ulysses S. Grant administration
- General Order No. 11 (1862)
- Post-presidency of Ulysses S. Grant
- World tour of Ulysses S. Grant
- Historical reputation of Ulysses S. Grant
- Cultural depictions of Ulysses S. Grant
- Personal Memoirs of Ulysses S. Grant
- Grant's Farm
- Gallery of images of Ulysses S. Grant
- Grant's Overland Campaign
- Grant's Tomb
- Template:Cabinet of President Ulysses S. Grant

== See also ==
- Bibliography of the American Civil War
- Bibliography of the Reconstruction Era
- Bibliography of Abraham Lincoln
- Jesse Root Grant (father of Ulysses S. Grant)
- Jesse Root Grant (politician) (son of Ulysses S. Grant)
- Reconstruction Era
