= Post-presidency of Ulysses S. Grant =

Ulysses S. Grant after he left the office of president of the United States

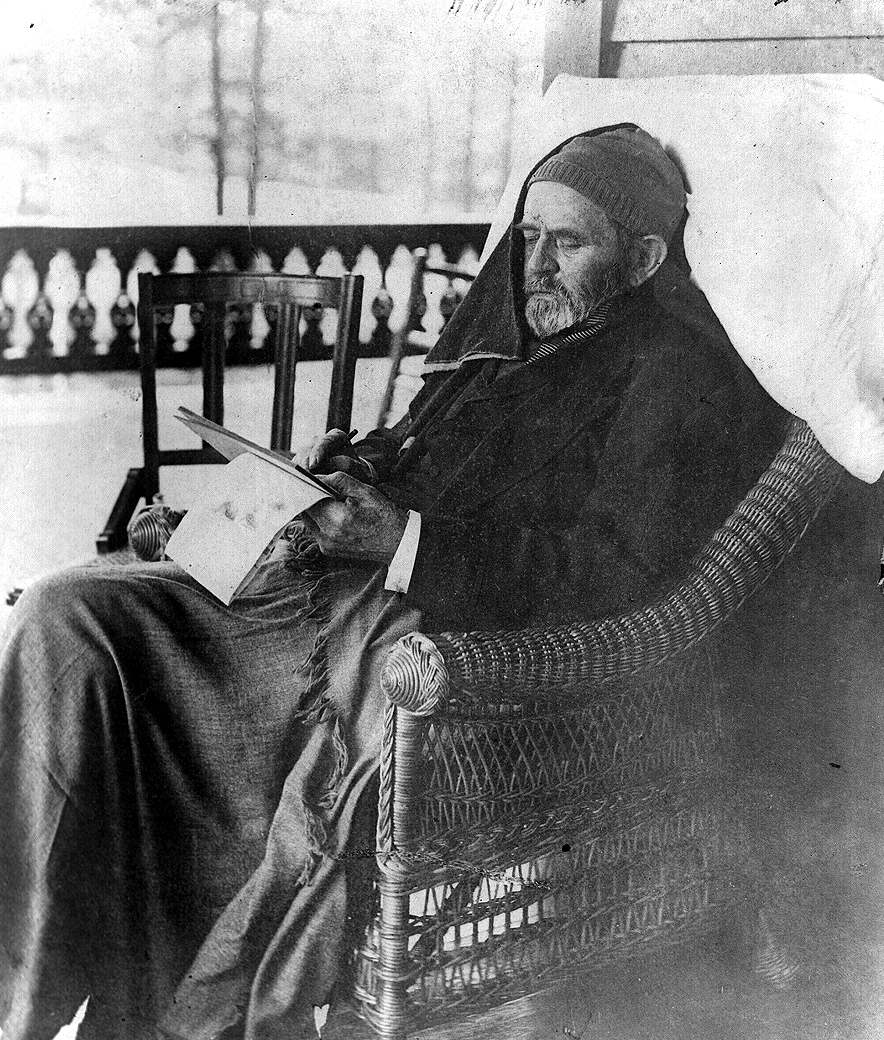
- Grant in 1885, less than a month before his death

18th President of the United States
- In office March 4, 1869 – March 4, 1877

Personal details
- Born: Hiram Ulysses Grant; April 27, 1822 Point Pleasant, Ohio, U.S.
- Died: July 23, 1885 (aged 63) Wilton, New York, U.S.
- Resting place: General Grant National Memorial; Manhattan, New York

After eight years in the presidential office during Reconstruction, Ulysses S. Grant looked forward to retirement from public life. When his second term in office ended in March 1877, Grant had gained weight, while he desired to travel the world and visit his daughter in Scotland. Grant began his post-presidential life with a two-year tour that took him and his wife and entourage around the world.

On returning, Grant was welcomed home with an adoration unknown since the end of the Civil War, and he began to consider running for a third term as president in 1880. Following a hard-fought defeat at the Republican National Convention that year, Grant embarked on a financial career in partnership with Ferdinand Ward, but the venture failed and Grant was nearly bankrupted.

Diagnosed with severe throat cancer in October 1884 at age 62, he began writing his memoirs as a way to tell his story and provide for his family after his death. The book, finished just before his death the following year, was a huge success and remains in print. Grant was interred in Grant's Tomb, a massive mausoleum in New York City.

== Leaving office ==
In 1876, the collected scandals of the last eight years led many in the Republican party to repudiate Grant. Benjamin Bristow was among the leading candidates to replace him, suggesting that a large faction desired an end to "Grantism" and feared that Grant would run for a third term. Ultimately, Grant did not run, but neither was Bristow the nominee, as the convention settled on Governor Rutherford B. Hayes of Ohio, a reformer. The Democrats nominated Samuel J. Tilden of New York, and the election that year was undecided for several months, due to voting irregularities in three Southern states. Grant assured both sides that he would not use the army to force a result, and agreed to the formation of an Electoral Commission to decide the matter. The result was the Compromise of 1877: Hayes was elected, but the last troops would be withdrawn from Southern capitals. The Republicans had won, but Reconstruction was over.

== World tour ==
Leaving the White House, Grant and family stayed with friends in New York, Ohio, and Philadelphia for two months before setting out on a tour of the world. The trip, which would last two years, began in Liverpool in May 1877 where enormous crowds greeted the ex-president and his entourage. Travelling to London, the Grants dined with Queen Victoria at Windsor Castle and Grant gave several speeches in the city. They next traveled to Belgium, Germany, and Switzerland before returning to England. There they spent a few months with their daughter, Nellie, who had married an Englishman and moved to that country several years before. Returning to the continent, Grant and his wife journeyed on to France and Italy, spending Christmas 1877 aboard USS Vandalia, a warship docked in Palermo. After a winter sojourn in the Holy Land, they visited Greece before returning to Italy and a meeting with Pope Leo XIII. Travelling to Spain and then to Germany again, Grant met with Chancellor Otto von Bismarck; the two men discussed military matters.

After another visit to England and then to Ireland, the Grants left Europe by ship, sailing through the Suez Canal to India. They visited Bombay, Lucknow, Varanasi, and Delhi, being welcomed in each city by the colonial officials. After India, it was on to Burma, Siam (where Grant met King Chulalongkorn), Singapore, and Vietnam. Traveling on to Hong Kong, Grant began to change his mind on the nature of colonization, believing that the British rule was not "purely selfish" but also good for the colonial subjects. Leaving Hong Kong, the Grants entered China proper, seeing the cities of Canton, Shanghai, and Peking. He declined to request an interview with the Guangxu Emperor, a child of seven, but did speak with the head of government, Prince Gong, and Li Hongzhang, a leading general. They discussed China's dispute with Japan over the Ryukyu Islands, and Grant agreed to help bring the two sides to agreement. After crossing over to Japan and meeting the Emperor Meiji, Grant convinced China to acquiesce in Japanese annexation of the islands, and the two nations avoided war.

By then the Grants had been gone two years, and were homesick. They crossed the Pacific and landed in San Francisco in September 1879, greeted by cheering crowds. After a visit to Yellowstone National Park, they returned at last to Philadelphia on December 16, 1879. The two-and-a-half-year voyage around the world had captured popular imagination, and Republicans—especially those of the new Stalwart faction, who had been excluded from the Hayes administration—saw Grant in a new light. With Hayes having forsworn a second term when he was elected, the nomination for 1880 was wide open, and many thought that Grant was the man for the job.

== Third term attempt ==
The Stalwarts, led by Grant's old political ally, Roscoe Conkling, saw the ex-president's renewed popularity as a way for their faction to regain prominence. Grant said nothing publicly, but privately he wanted the job and encouraged his men. Elihu B. Washburne wrote to Grant in February 1880, urging him to run; Grant demurred, saying he would be happy for the Republicans to win with another candidate, though he preferred James G. Blaine to John Sherman. Even so, Conkling and John A. Logan began to organize delegates in Grant's favor. When the convention convened in Chicago in June there were more delegates pledge to Grant than to any other candidate, but he was short of a majority.

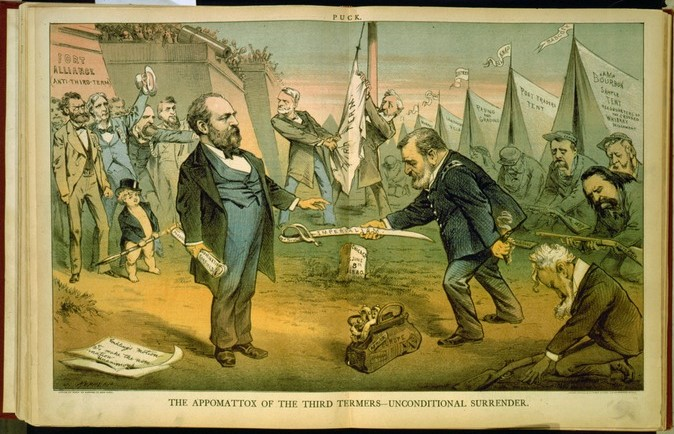
Ulysses S. Grant is shown surrendering to James A. Garfield after losing the 1880 Republican presidential nomination to him, in this satirical Puck cartoon.

Grant's popularity was high, but fading. Washburne conjectured that had Grant stayed abroad longer, the wave of adulation that greeted him on his return might have carried him all the way back to the White House. Conkling placed Grant's name in nomination with an elegant speech, his most famous line being: "When asked which state he hails from, our sole reply shall be, he hails from Appomattox and its famous apple tree." With 370 votes needed for nomination, the first ballot had Grant at 304, Blaine at 284, Sherman at 93, and the rest scattered to minor candidates. Subsequent ballots followed, with roughly the same result; neither Grant nor Blaine could win. After thirty-six ballots, Blaine's delegates deserted him and combined with those of other candidates to nominate a compromise candidate: Representative James A. Garfield of Ohio. Grant received 306 votes on the final ballot, his supporters staying committed to their man to the bitter end. Logan moved that the nomination be made unanimous, and it was, but those 306 Stalwarts were immortalized in Republican myth.

Grant accepted his defeat, even claiming to be relieved at the result. He gave speeches for Garfield, but declined to criticize the Democratic nominee, Winfield Scott Hancock, a general who had served under Grant in the Army of the Potomac. Garfield was elected by a narrow popular margin, but a solid Electoral College vote—214 to 155. After the election, Grant gave Garfield his public support, but also pushed him to include Stalwarts in his administration.

== Grant & Ward ==
Grant's world tour, although successful, was costly. When he returned to America, Grant had depleted most of his savings and needed to earn money. To that end, Grant, Jay Gould, and former Mexican Finance Secretary Matías Romero chartered the Mexican Southern Railroad, which planned to build a railroad from Oaxaca to Mexico City. At the same time, Grant used his influence to convince Chester A. Arthur, who had succeeded Garfield as president in 1881, to negotiate a free trade treaty with Mexico. Arthur and the Mexican government agreed, but the United States Senate rejected the treaty in 1883. The railroad was similarly unsuccessful, falling into bankruptcy the following year.

At the same time, Grant's son Ulysses Jr. ("Buck") had opened a Wall Street brokerage house with Ferdinand Ward. Ward was regarded as a rising star, and the firm, Grant & Ward, was initially successful. In 1883, Grant joined the firm and invested $100,000 of his own money. The firm's success attracted more investors, who bought securities through them, then used the securities as collateral to borrow money to buy more securities. Grant & Ward then pledged that collateral to borrow more money to trade in securities on the firm's own account. The practice–called hypothecation–was legal and accepted; what was illegal was rehypothecation, the practice of pledging the same securities as collateral for multiple loans. Ward, with the collusion of the bank involved, did this for many of the firm's assets. If the trades resulted in profit, then there would be no problem; if they went bad, however, multiple loans would come due, all backed up by the same collateral. Historians acknowledge that Grant was likely unaware of Ward's tactics, but it is unclear how much Buck Grant knew. In May 1884, enough investments went bad to convince Ward that the firm would soon be bankrupted. He told Grant of the impending failure, but suggested that it was a temporary shortfall. Grant approached businessman William Henry Vanderbilt, who gave Grant a personal loan of $150,000. Grant invested the money in the firm, but it was not enough to save the firm from failure. Essentially penniless, but compelled by a sense of personal honor, Grant repaid Vanderbilt with his Civil War mementos. Although the market value did not cover the loan, Vanderbilt insisted it was paid in full. The matter left Grant financially destitute.

== Memoirs ==
Grant learned in 1884 that he was suffering from severe throat cancer. He had forfeited his military pension when he assumed the Presidency, but Congress subsequently restored Grant to the rank of General of the Army with full retirement pay.

At the suggestion of Robert Johnson, Grant wrote several articles on his Civil War campaigns for The Century Magazine at $500 each. The articles were well received by critics, and Johnson suggested Grant write a book of memoirs, as Sherman and others had successfully done. Grant took up the project and asked an old friend and fellow writer, Adam Badeau, to review and critique his work. Century offered Grant a book contract, including a 10% royalty. When Grant shared this information with his friend Mark Twain, Twain suggested that Grant counter with a request for double the royalty; at the same time, he made his own offer to Grant for his memoirs, talking of a 75% royalty. Grant ultimately decided on Twain's company, Charles L. Webster and Co., as his publisher. His son Fred assisted primarily with references and proofing. Grant finished his memoir just a few days before his death.

Twain created a unique marketing system designed to reach millions of veterans with a patriotic appeal just as the nation began mourning the war hero's death. Ten thousand agents canvassed the North, following a script Twain had devised; many were themselves veterans who dressed in their old uniforms. They sold 350,000 two-volume sets at prices from $3.50 to $12 (depending on the binding). Each copy contained what looked like a handwritten note from Grant himself. In the end, Grant's widow Julia received about $450,000, suggesting a royalty of about 30%.

The Personal Memoirs of Ulysses S. Grant has been highly regarded by the general public, military historians and literary critics. Grant was a shrewd, intelligent, and effective writer. He portrayed himself in the persona of the honorable Western hero, whose strength lies in his honesty and straightforwardness. He candidly depicts his battles against both the external Confederates and internal Army foes.

== Death and burial ==
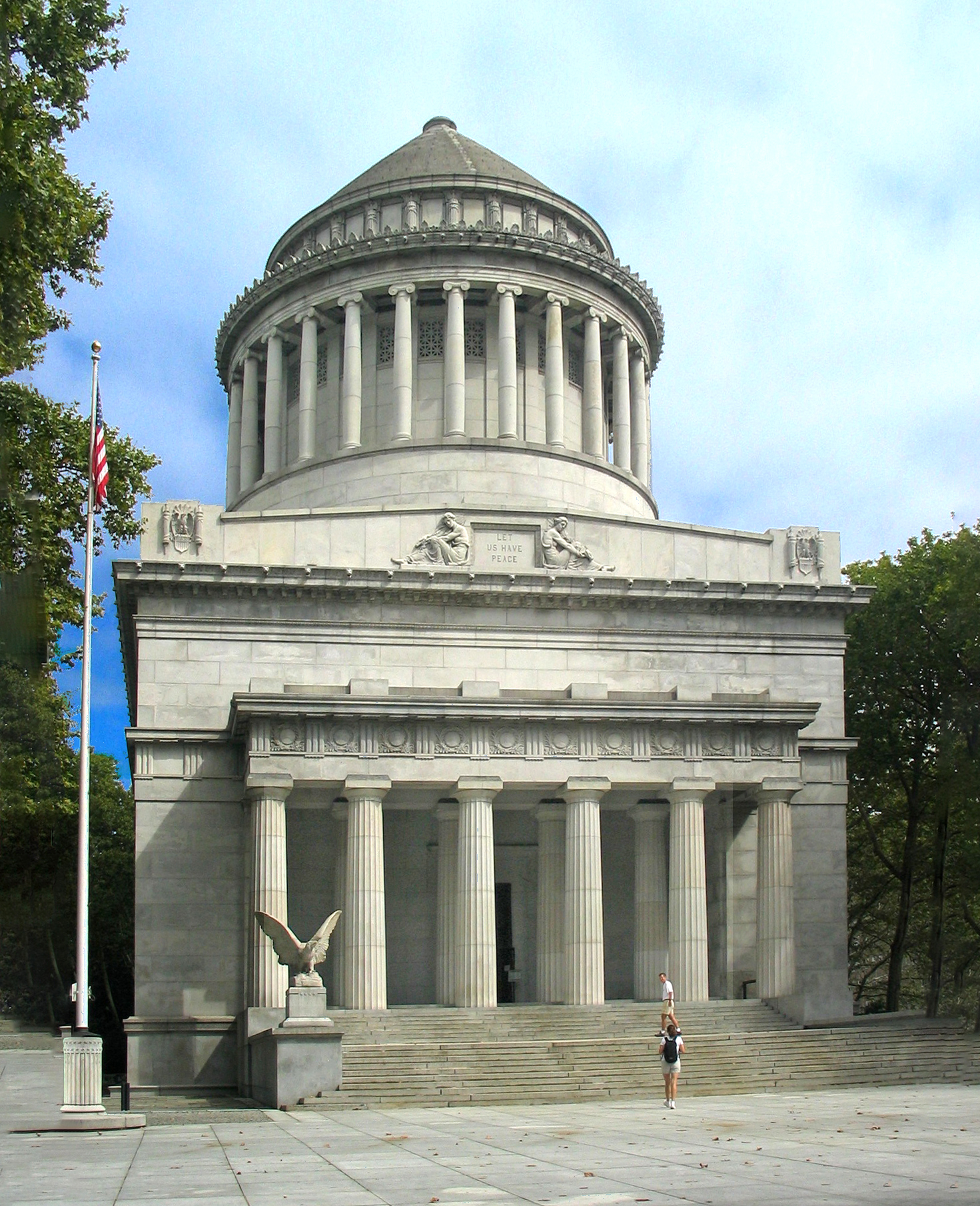
General Grant National Memorial, known colloquially as "Grant's Tomb", is the largest mausoleum in North America, and one of the largest in the world.

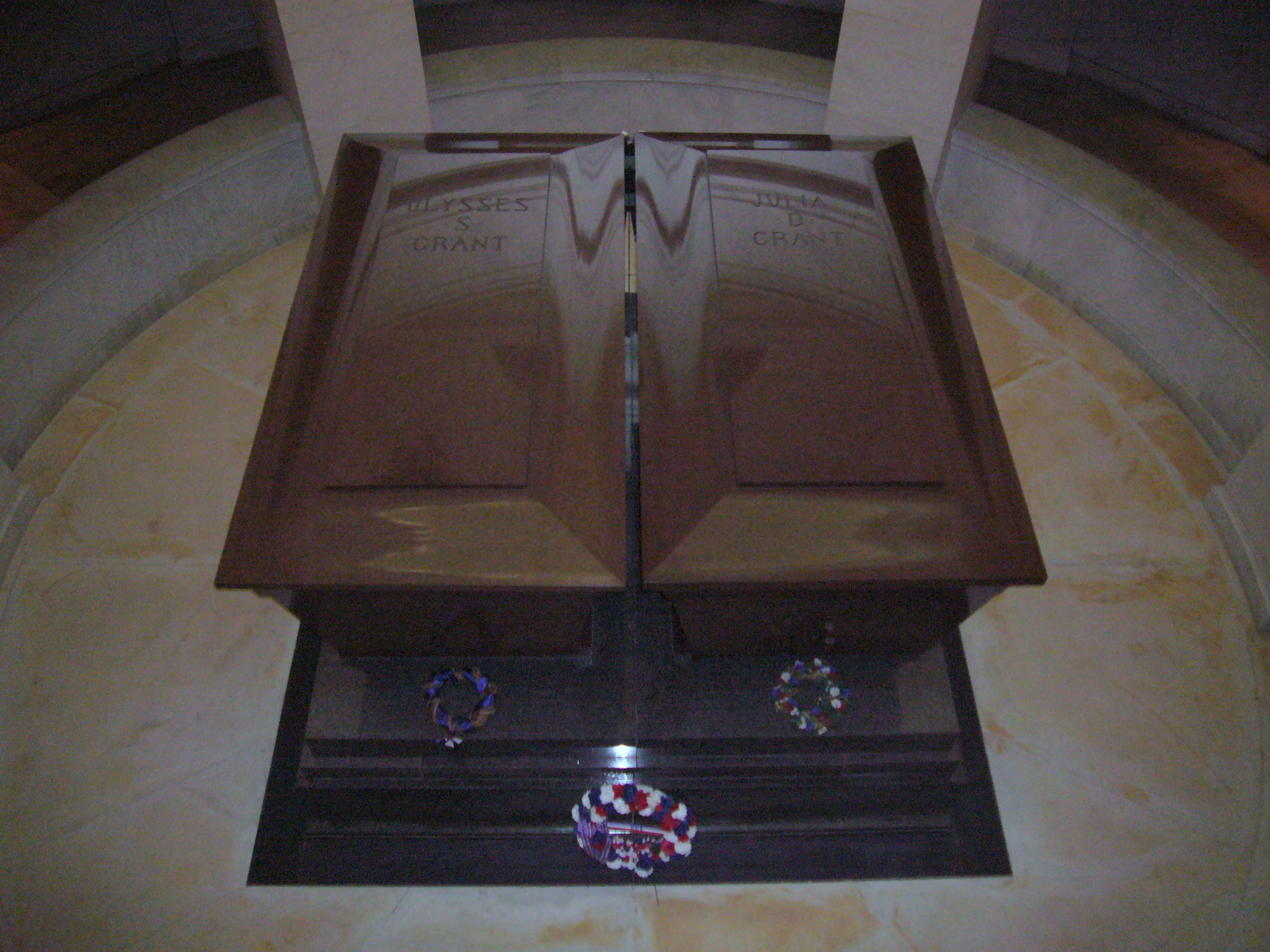
Grant and his wife Julia interred inside Grant's Tomb

Three days after finishing his memoirs, Grant died of throat cancer at the age of 63 in a cottage at the top of Mount McGregor in upstate New York. His last words were, "I hope that nobody will be distressed on my account." Commanding General of the United States Army Philip Sheridan ordered a day-long tribute to Grant on all military posts, and a six-month mourning among West Point cadets. President Grover Cleveland ordered a thirty-day nationwide period of mourning. Private services were held in Mount McGregor on August 4. After lying in state in the New York State Capitol at Albany, Grant's body was placed on a funeral train and traveled via West Point to New York City, where a quarter of a million people viewed in the two days prior to the funeral. His funeral was held August 8, in New York, and was supervised by Military Division of the Atlantic head Winfield Scott Hancock. It featured a procession of 60,000 men, many of them veterans from the Grand Army of the Republic or other veterans’ organizations.

Grant’s casket was placed on a catafalque pulled by two dozen horses between New York City Hall and Riverside Park. His pallbearers included Generals Sherman, Sheridan, Buckner, and Johnston, as well as GAR head John A. Logan and admiral David Dixon Porter. Attendance at the New York funeral purportedly topped 1.5 million. In the days before and after the funeral, ceremonies were held in other major cities around the country. Those who eulogized Grant in the press likened him to George Washington and Abraham Lincoln, then the nation's two greatest heroes. His body was interred in New York City's Riverside Park, first in a temporary tomb and later in General Grant National Memorial ("Grant's Tomb"), the largest mausoleum in North America. His wife, Julia Grant, was also interred in Grant's Tomb following her death in 1902. Grant is also honored by the Ulysses S. Grant Memorial at the base of Capitol Hill in Washington.

== See also ==
- Bibliography of Ulysses S. Grant
- Bibliography of the American Civil War

== Sources ==
- Hesseltine, William B. (1957) [1935]. Ulysses S. Grant: Politician. New York, New York: F. Ungar Pub. Co. ISBN 1-931313-85-7. Archived from the original on October 13, 2007 – via Questia.
- McFeely, William S. (1981). Grant: A Biography. Norton. ISBN 0-393-01372-3.
- Smith, Jean Edward (2001). Grant. New York, New York: Simon & Schuster. ISBN 0-684-84927-5.
- Waugh, Joan (2009). U.S. Grant: American Hero, American Myth. The University of North Carolina Press. ISBN 978-0-8078-3317-9.
