= Commanding generalship of Ulysses S. Grant =

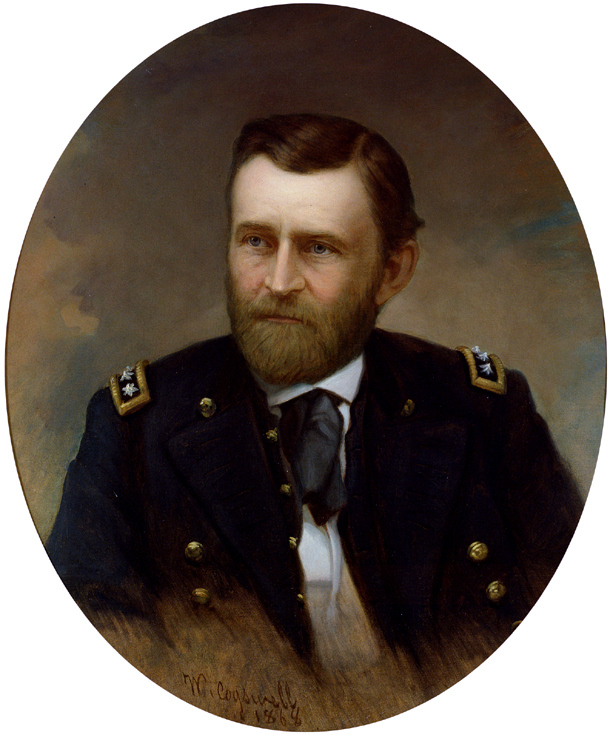
Ulysses S. Grant, 1868

After the Civil War, Ulysses S. Grant spent four years as head of the United States Army in peacetime. With his defeat of Robert E. Lee and the Confederacy, Grant was the most popular man in the country. As the Civil War ended Grant turned his attention to the Plains in the American West where there were numerous conflicts between white settlers, railroads, and Native Americans that resulted in wars between the Natives and the U.S. military. While the attempted Fenian invasion of Canada and French intervention in Mexico took some of his time, Grant's biggest focus was on Reconstruction of the defeated Southern states. Grant found himself caught between President Andrew Johnson, who wanted leniency to the South and a continuation of the social structure there, and the Radical Republicans in Congress, who wanted harsher punishment to rebel leaders and more government assistance to the freed slaves. Grant preserved his popularity and authority throughout the crisis that culminated in Johnson's impeachment. In 1868, the Republicans nominated Grant for president, and he won easily over his Democratic challenger.

== Celebrations and honors ==
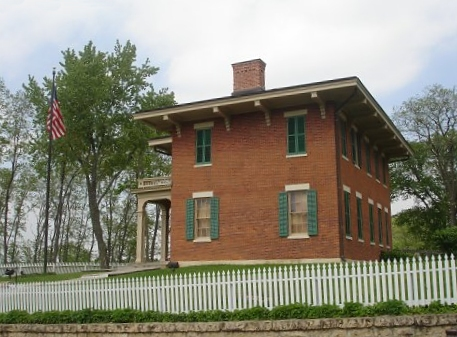
The post-Civil War home of Ulysses S. Grant, in Galena, Illinois.

In May 1865, the Union League of Philadelphia purchased the Grants a house in that city, but Grant's work was in Washington. He attempted to commute for a time and return on the weekends, but he and Julia decided to move to Washington. They secured a place in Georgetown Heights, while Grant instructed Elihu Washburne that, politically, his legal residence remained in Galena, Illinois. In the spring of 1865, Grant made an appearance at Cooper Union in New York; the New York Times described the reception for the war hero: "...the enhanced and bewildered multitude trembled with extraordinary delight." Further travels that summer, with repeated enthusiastic receptions, took the Grants to Albany and back to Galena and throughout Illinois and Ohio. On July 25, 1866, Congress promoted Grant to the newly created rank of General of the Army of the United States.

Grant was the most popular man in the country. When Johnson was at loggerheads with the Congress over Reconstruction, he took his case to the people with his infamous "swing around the circle" throughout the country and he sought to capitalize on Grant's popularity by having Grant travel with him. Grant, wishing to appear loyal, agreed to accompany Johnson; however he confided in his wife that he thought Johnson's speeches were a "national disgrace". Grant continued his efforts to appear loyal while not alienating Republican legislators essential to his future. At the same time, Johnson also suspected Grant to be a potential candidate in the 1868 presidential election, and decided to replace Secretary of War Stanton with Grant or Sherman. Grant discussed the matter with Sherman and initially convinced him to avoid the politically troubled president.

Johnson sent Grant on a fact-finding tour of the South after which he filed a report recommending continuation of the Freedmen's Bureau but opposed use of black troops in garrisons which were still needed in the South for protection of both races. He also warned of threats by disaffected poor people, black and white, and recommended that local decision making be entrusted only to "thinking men", by which he was thought to have meant, men of property. In this respect, Grant's initial Reconstruction policy aligned with Johnson's policy of pardoning established southern leaders and restoring them to their positions of power. He joined Johnson in arguing that Congress should allow congressional representatives from the South to be seated.

== Mexico and Canada ==
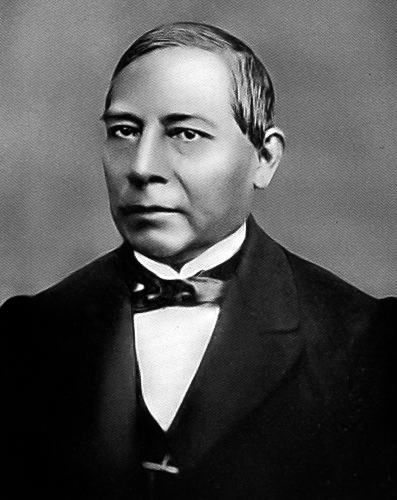
Grant supported Mexican president Benito Juárez and hoped to see the French expelled from Mexico.

Grant, as commanding general, immediately had to contend with Maximilian of Mexico and the French army which had taken over Mexico under the authority of Napoleon III. Most Americans felt this to be a violation of the Monroe Doctrine. Johnson told Grant to put military pressure on the French to leave Mexico by sending 50,000 troops to the Texas border under Sheridan. Grant told Sheridan to do whatever it took to get Maximilian to abdicate and the French Army to leave Mexico. Sheridan sent Benito Juárez, the ousted leader of Mexico, 60,000 US rifles to aid in an effort to defeat Maximilian. By 1866, the French Army completely withdrew from Mexico; Maximilian was executed by Juárez in 1867. In a cabinet meeting, Johnson suggested Grant be assigned to the Mexican frontier as a way of removing him from the political mainstream. Grant immediately recognized the nature of this proposal, and refused. As a compromise Grant sent Sherman (now promoted to Lieutenant General) in his place.

After the Civil War, thousands of Irish veterans joined the Fenian Brotherhood with the intention of invading and holding Canada hostage in exchange for Irish independence. In June 1866, Johnson sent Grant to Buffalo, New York, to assess the situation. He ordered the Canada–US border closed to prevent Fenian soldiers from crossing over at Fort Erie and that more weapons be confiscated. In June 1866, the United States Army arrested 700 Fenian troops at Buffalo and the Fenians gave up on their attempt to invade Canada.

== Indian Wars ==
Grant, as commanding general, inherited the "Indian Wars" in the western frontiers, especially the Plains, as the United States continued westward expansion. After the Civil War ended in 1865, Grant turned his attention to the neglected American western frontier. One of these Plains wars, known as Red Cloud's War, starting in July 1866, was led by Sioux Chief Red Cloud. To end hostilities, Grant ordered forts on the Powder River to be abandoned and for General William T. Sherman to make a peace treaty with the Sioux. As a result, Red Cloud signed the Fort Laramie Treaty in 1868 successfully negotiated by Sherman.

== Grant, Johnson, and Reconstruction ==
In November 1865, Johnson sent Grant on a fact-finding mission to the South. Grant recommended continuation of a reformed Freedmen's Bureau, which Johnson opposed, but advised against the use of black troops in garrisons, which he believed encouraged an alternative to farm labor. Grant did not believe the people of the South were ready for self-rule, and that both whites and blacks in the South required protection by the federal government. Concerned four years of war led to a diminished respect for civil authorities, Grant concluded the Army should continue their presence to maintain order. He also warned of threats by disaffected poor people, black and white, and recommended that local decision-making be entrusted only to "thinking men of the South" (i.e., white men of property). In this respect, Grant's opinion on Reconstruction aligned with Johnson's policy of restoring former Confederates to their positions of power, arguing that Congress should allow representatives from the South to take their seats. Grant believed that former Confederates should be reenlisted into the U.S. military. He personally intervened on behalf of Lee, who had been indicted for treason along with other Confederate generals, keeping Lee safe from prosecution, saving the nation from opening up old war wounds. In January 1866, Grant authorized the removal of cases against Union officers, to federal courts and the Freedmen's Bureau. On July 25, 1866, Congress promoted Grant to the newly created rank of General of the Army of the United States.

In the elections of 1866, an intraparty fight arose in Maryland, when the mayor of Baltimore, a Radical, appointed Radical police commissioners who would be responsible for managing voter registration. Maryland's governor, a partisan of Johnson, requested that federal troops intervene, which Grant initially considered inappropriate. To provide some manner of response, Grant met as a civilian with the opposing party heads and, with use of the army an implicit threat, was able to facilitate a settlement.

Grant's service as Union General, caused him to join the Republican Party, and forced him to consider African Americans as both humans and soldiers. Johnson, a robust Democrat, sided with white supremacists and openly held racist views, believing blacks were inferior and that the country and government were for "white men". Johnson favored a lenient approach to Reconstruction, calling for an immediate return of the former Confederate states into the Union without any guarantee of African American civil rights. The Radical Republican-controlled Congress opposed the idea and refused to admit Congressmen from the former Confederate states. Congress, over Johnson's vetoes, renewed the Freedmen's Bureau and passed the Civil Rights Act of 1866. With Johnson at war with Congress, Grant and Johnson found themselves in a quiet conflict over Reconstruction enforcement, while Grant as a soldier was determined to remain loyal to his Commander In Chief. Needing Grant's popularity, Johnson took Grant on his "Swing Around the Circle" tour, speaking out against Congressional Reconstruction. Enthusiastic cheering for Grant interrupting Johnson's speeches caused the relationship between Johnson and Grant to cool. Grant believed that Johnson was purposefully agitating conservative opinion to defy Congressional Reconstruction, privately calling Johnson's speeches a "national disgrace". Concerned that Johnson's differences with Congress would cause renewed insurrection, Grant ordered Southern arsenals to ship arms north to prevent their capture by Southern state governments. Having returned to Washington, Johnson attempted to send Grant on a mission to Mexico, but Grant refused to go, believing the President did not have authority to send him on a diplomatic mission.

On March 2, 1867, overriding Johnson's veto, making unprecedented use of the power of the military, Congress passed the first of three Reconstruction Acts, which divided the southern states into five military districts. Transitional state governments in each district were to be led by military governors, to ensure that African Americans' newly granted constitutional and congressional rights were protected. Grant, who was to select the general to govern each district, preferred the will of Congress through the enforcement of congressional Reconstruction, but at the outset opposed the use of the military. Nevertheless, Grant adapted and by complying with the Acts and instructing his subordinates to do likewise, he further alienated Johnson. For example, Grant authorized Sheridan to remove public officials in Louisiana who were against congressional Reconstruction. Sheridan's aggressive methods to register freedmen met with Johnson's disapproval, and the President sought his removal. Grant perceptively stayed the middle course, and recommended a rebuke but not a dismissal. Protecting Grant, Congress passed the Command of the Army Act, attached to an army appropriation bill, preventing his removal or relocation, and forcing Johnson to pass orders through Grant, the general in chief. Republicans gained majorities in all 11 states, and African Americans were elected to Congress and high state offices. Grant hoped that Reconstruction Acts would help pacify the South. The Army conducted new elections for constitutional conventions in the ex-Confederate states. They registered blacks to vote and in many places prevented from voting white men who had supported the Confederacy, as set out in the disenfranchisement clause of the Fourteenth Amendment. Throughout the Reconstruction period, more than 1,500 African Americans were elected to political office, while Grant and the military protected their rights initially by overturning the black codes in 1867. Congressional Reconstruction finally ended with the Compromise of 1877 and the complete withdrawal of military troops from the southern states.

== Johnson's impeachment ==
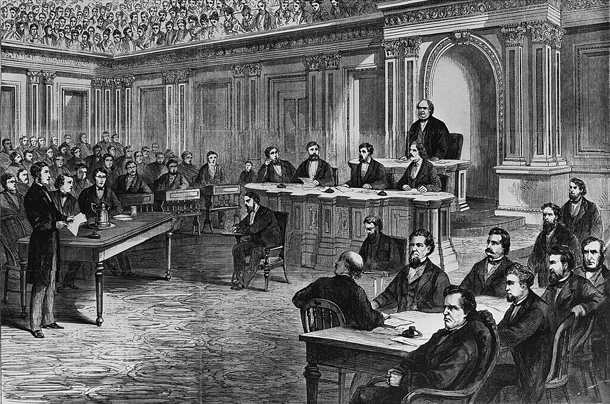
The trial of Andrew Johnson before the Senate

Johnson and Grants differing civilian and military backgrounds would cause a collision course over policy. On August 12, 1867, during a Senate recess, President Johnson suspended Secretary of War Edwin Stanton, a Lincoln appointee who sympathized with Congressional Reconstruction. Grant, himself, respected Stanton and sided with him on Reconstruction while both shared a dismay for Johnson. To keep Grant under control as a potential political rival, Johnson asked him to take the post. Grant recommended against the move, in light of the Tenure of Office Act, which required Senate approval for cabinet removals. Johnson believed the Act did not apply to officers appointed by the previous president and forced the issue by making Grant an interim appointee on the same day. Grant agreed to accept the post temporarily, and Stanton vacated the office until the Senate reconvened.

On January 10, 1868, the Senate Committee on Military Affairs voted to recommend reinstatement of Stanton to office. The following day, Grant consulted with his staff and rereading the Tenure of Office Act, he learned that if he kept the office he would be subject to a $10,000 fine and a five-year prison term. Grant hurried to the White House and told Johnson he was not going to break federal law. Johnson told Grant he would pay the fine and go to prison in Grant's place, but Grant found Johnson's answer preposterous. On Monday, January 13, the Senate voted to reinstate Stanton to office 35 to 6. The following morning, Grant locked up his War Department office and gave the key to Assistant Adjutant General Edward D. Townsend. One hour later, when Stanton arrived at the War Department office, Townsend gave Stanton the key, witnessed by welcoming onlookers.

This incurred Johnson's wrath; at a cabinet meeting immediately afterward, Johnson accused Grant of breaking his promise to remain Secretary of War. Grant disputed that he had ever made such a promise although cabinet members later testified he had done so. Newspapers friendly to Johnson published a series of articles to discredit Grant over returning the War Department to Stanton, stating that Grant had been deceptive in the matter. This public insult infuriated Grant, and he defended himself in an angry letter to Johnson, after which the two men were confirmed foes. When Grant's statement became public, it increased his popularity among Radical Republicans and he emerged from the controversy unscathed. Although Grant favored Johnson's impeachment, he took no active role in the impeachment proceedings, which were fueled in part by Johnson's removal of Stanton. Johnson barely survived, and none of the other Republican leaders directly involved benefited politically in their unsuccessful attempt to remove the president.

== 1868 presidential campaign ==
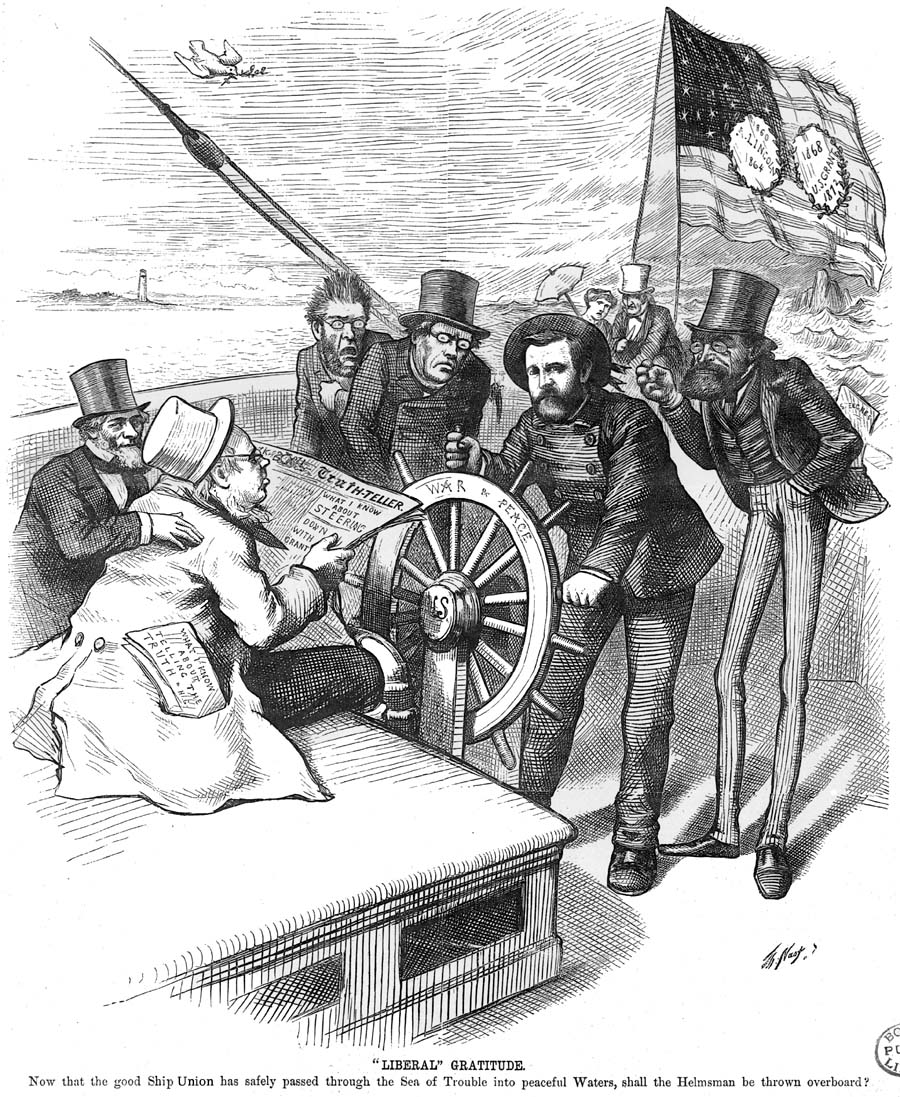
Cartoon by Thomas Nast on Grant's opponents in the re-election campaign

Grant's curt response to Johnson in the Stanton matter increased his popularity with the Radical Republicans. John Weiss Forney, editor of the Washington Daily Chronicle, who had paved the way for previous presidential nominations, took up the effort for Grant's nomination, by first inquiring with Brig. Gen. John Aaron Rawlins, a Grant confidant, about Grant's interest in the presidency. Rawlins responded that while Grant was a loyal member of the Republican Party, he would be unable to serve as president for financial reasons, since he would lose his lifetime military pension upon ascendancy to the White House, and the presidency did not provide any such income benefit. By becoming President under current terms, Grant would at best leave the office at age 56 with no income, assuming he served two terms. Rawlins hoped Forney could facilitate a legislative change to solve the problem. The ultimate answer was that this could not be changed. Forney forged ahead with an editorial reviewing Grant's record with the recommendation for his nomination; Grant personally approved the writing before publication. By reviewing the article, though limited to the accuracy of his record, Grant implicitly opened the door for the nomination despite the precarious financial prospects in his future.

The Republicans chose Grant as their presidential candidate on the first ballot at the 1868 Republican National Convention in Chicago; he faced no significant opposition. The Republicans kept the name "Union" on their ticket as had been done earlier at their 1864 convention. Grant received all 650 votes from delegates, with no other candidate being nominated, and upon the announcement was welcomed with a "frenzied enthusiasm". In his letter of acceptance, Grant concluded with "Let us have peace", which became his campaign slogan. For vice president, the delegates nominated House Speaker Schuyler Colfax. In June, Grant traveled to St. Louis, having gained possession of his father-in-law's plantation, and an additional 280 acres of Dent land, he had twelve slave cabins demolished, to banish the vestiges of slavery. As was common practice at the time, Grant remained at home in Galena during the campaign, and left most of the active campaigning and speaking on his behalf to his campaign manager William E. Chandler and others.

The Democrats nominated former New York Governor Horatio Seymour. Their campaign focused mainly on ending Reconstruction and returning control of the South to the white planter class, which alienated many War Democrats in the North. The Democrats attacked Republicans' support of African American rights while deriding Grant, calling him captain of the "Black Marines". Democratic orators over and over proclaimed Grant was a drunkard. Grant himself did not take to the stump, allowing Republican spokesmen to identify him with patriotism and with grief for Lincoln's martyrdom.

Grant's 1862 General Order No. 11 and antisemitism became an issue during the presidential campaign. In a letter, published after the election, Grant sought to unequivocally distance himself from General Order No. 11. Grant repudiated his order, saying "I have no prejudice against sect or race, but want each individual to be judged by his own merit." (Note: As President, Grant would atone for 1862's expulsion of the Jews. Historian Jonathan Sarna argues that Grant became one of the greatest friends of Jews in American history, meeting with them often and appointing them to high office. He was the first president to condemn atrocities against Jews in Europe, thus putting human rights on the American diplomatic agenda.) As was expected at the time, Grant returned to his home state (Note: Residents of Galena gave Grant the home in 1865 as thanks for his war service. After his presidential term ended in 1877, Grant visited the home occasionally. Maintenance of the home as a memorial to Grant started in 1904 and continues today.) and left the active campaigning to his campaign manager, William E. Chandler, and others. The Republican campaign focused on continuing Reconstruction and restoring the public credit.

Grant won the election by 300,000 votes out of 5,716,082 votes cast, receiving an electoral college landslide, of 214 votes to Seymour's 80. Grant, at the age of 46 became the youngest president on record. His election was a triumph of principles that included sound money, efficient government, and the restoration of Southern reconstructed states. When he assumed the presidency, Grant had never before held elected office and, at the age of 46, was the youngest person yet elected president. Grant was the first president to be elected after the nation had outlawed slavery and granted citizenship to former slaves. Implementation of these new rights was slow to come; in the 1868 election, the black vote counted in only 16 of the 37 states, nearly all in the South. Grant lost Louisiana and Georgia primarily due to Ku Klux Klan violence against African American voters.

== See also ==
- List of American Civil War generals (Union)
- List of American Civil War generals (Confederate)
- Bibliography of Ulysses S. Grant
- Bibliography of the American Civil War

== Sources ==
- Brands, H. W. (2012). The Man Who Saved The Union Ulysses S. Grant in War and Peace. New York: Doubleday. ISBN 978-0-385-53241-9.
- Chernow, Ron (2017). Grant. New York: Penguin Press. ISBN 978-1-5942-0487-6.
- Cullum, George W. (1891). Biographical Register of the Officers and Graduates of the U.S. Military Academy. Vol. II (3rd ed.). Boston: Houghton Mifflin. OCLC 1417240.
- Edgar, Walter B. (1998). South Carolina: A History. Univ of South Carolina Press. ISBN 978-1-5700-3255-4.
- Foner, Eric (2014). Reconstruction: America's Unfinished Revolution 1863–1877 Updated Version. Harper Perennial. ISBN 978-0062354518.
- McFeely, William S. (1981). Grant: A Biography. Norton. ISBN 0-393-01372-3.
- Perman, Michael (1973). Reunion Without Compromise: The South and Reconstruction, 1865–1868. Cambridge University Press. ISBN 0-521-20044-X.
- Rogers, William Warren; Atkins, Leah Rawls (2010). Alabama: The History of a Deep South State. University Alabama Press. ISBN 978-0817355982.
- Sarna, Jonathan D. (2012a). When General Grant Expelled the Jews. Schocken Books. ISBN 978-0-8052-4279-9.
- Schlesinger, Arthur Meier Jr. (1973). History of U.S. Political Parties: 1860-1910: the gilded age of politics. Chelsea House Publishers. ISBN 978-0-8352-0594-8.
- Snodgrass, Mary Ellen, ed. (2015). The Civil War Era and Reconstruction: An Encyclopedia of Social, Political, Cultural and Economic History. New York: Routledge.
- Simon, John Y. (2002). "Ulysses S. Grant". In Graff, Henry (ed.). The Presidents: A Reference History (3rd ed.). Macmillan Library Reference USA. pp. 241–255. ISBN 0-684-80551-0.
- Smith, Jean Edward (2001). Grant. New York, New York: Simon & Schuster. ISBN 0-684-84927-5.
- White, Ronald C. (2016). American Ulysses: A Life of Ulysses S. Grant. Random House Publishing Group. ISBN 978-1-5883-6992-5.
