= Edward H. Bonekemper =

American military historian, teacher, and writer

- Education: Muhlenberg College; Old Dominion University; Yale Law School
- Spouse: Susan Weidemoyer
- Writing career
- Subjects: Slavery, Civil War, and Union and Confederate generals

Edward Henry Bonekemper III (1942–2017) was a military historian, teacher, and writer. He wrote frequently about slavery, the American Civil War, and Union and Confederate generals. He was a frequent speaker at Civil War roundtables as well as at the Smithsonian Institution.

== Early life ==
Born in Hatfield, Pennsylvania in 1942, Edward H. Bonekemper III was a son of Edward H. Bonekemper II and Marie Bonekemper (née Adams). He married Susan Bonekemper (née Weidemoyer) in 1964.

== Education ==
In 1964, Bonekemper graduated cum laude from Muhlenberg College in Allentown, Pennsylvania with a bachelor's degree in American history. While attending Muhlenberg, he was given two awards based on his educational performance (Best Thesis and Best American History CPA). He later earned his master's degree in American history at Old Dominion University, and completed his Juris Doctor at Yale Law School.

== Career ==
From 1969 to January 2003, Bonekemper worked as a federal government attorney. Within these 34 years, he worked for 16 years as a lead hazardous materials transportation attorney for the United States Department of Transportation, and for four years as the lead coal strip mining regulatory attorney at the United States Department of Interior. During this time, he was also writing for Navy and Coast Guard publications. He was a speaker and teacher for the Coast Guard and Interior and Transportation Departments.

Bonekemper was also a retired Commander in the Coast Guard Reserve.

For eight years (2003 to 2010), Bonekemper taught military history part-time and was a visiting lecturer at Muhlenberg College, his alma mater. Bonekemper was also an instructor in American Constitutional History and Maritime Law at the United States Coast Guard Academy, and an adjunct professor of Constitutional History at the American Military University.

Bonekemper wrote articles for many publications including The Washington Times, The Journal of Afro-American History, and The Journal of Negro History.

From 1998 onward, Bonekemper published non-fiction books about the Civil War. His interest in Civil War history grew after multiple conversations with his father-in-law about this particular topic. His first book took him seven years to complete.

Between 2010 and 2016, he was the book review editor of Civil War News.

Bonekemper gave more than ten lectures at the Smithsonian Institution about the Civil War. He also spoke at hundreds of Civil War roundtable meetings, the Delta Queen, the Lincoln Forum of the District of Columbia, the Chautauqua Institution, and numerous other events. Bonekemper made appearances on C-SPAN to discuss Grant's and Lee's Civil war generalships.

== Death ==
At the time of his death in 2017, Bonekemper resided in Lancaster, Pennsylvania. He had been married to Susan Weidemoyer Bonekemper for 53 years.

== Awards ==
Throughout his career, Bonekemper earned numerous awards. These include:

- U.S. Government Distinguished Career Service Award (2003)
- Secretary of Transportation's Silver Medal (1989)
- Coast Guard Commendation and Achievement Medals (1974, 1979)
- Federal Bar Association's Younger Federal Lawyer Award (1973)
- Federal Bar Association's Transportation Attorney of the Year Award (1993)
- Muhlenberg College Alumni Lifetime Achievement Award (2009)

== Publications ==
Books

- How Robert E. Lee Lost the Civil War (1998) ISBN 978-1887901154.
- McClellan and Failure: A Study of Civil War Fear, Incompetence and Worse (2007) ISBN 978-0786428946.
- Ulysses S. Grant: A Victor, Not a Butcher: The Military Genius of the Man Who Won the Civil War (2010) ISBN 978-1596986411.
- Grant and Lee: Victorious American and Vanquished Virginian (2012) ISBN 978-1621570103.
- Lincoln and Grant: The Westerners Who Won the Civil War (2012) ISBN 978-1439286135.
- The Myth of the Lost Cause: Why the South Fought the Civil War and Why the North Won (2015) ISBN 1621574547.
- The 10 Biggest Civil War Blunders (2017) ISBN 978-1621576648.
