= Michael Perman =

American history professor and author (died 2020)

Michael Perman (died July 24, 2020) was a history professor and author in the United States. He was a professor emeritus and served as chairman of the history department at the University of Illinois at Chicago. According to his Bio, Perman received his B.A. at Oxford University and his Ph.D. at the University of Chicago. He was awarded a Guggenheim Fellowship in 1979 and 1980 and was appointed the John Adams Distinguished Professor in American History at Utrecht University in the Netherlands in 2002 and 2003.

== Bibliography ==
- Reunion Without Compromise: The South and Reconstruction, 1865–1868. University Press, Cambridge. 1973. ISBN 9780521200448, OCLC 695173
- The Road to Redemption: Southern Politics, 1869–1879. University of North Carolina Press, Chapel Hill. 1984. ISBN 9780807864043, OCLC 54359201
- Emancipation and Reconstruction. Harlan Davidson. Arlington Heights, Ill. 1987. ISBN 9780882959955, OCLC 50694792
- The Coming of the American Civil War D.C. Heath & Co. Lexington, Mass. 1993. editor. ISBN 9780669271065, OCLC 27174364
- Perspectives on the American Past Scott, Foresman. Glenview, Ill. 1989. editor. ISBN 9780673186164, OCLC 18557603
- Major Problems in the Civil War and Reconstruction Houghton Mifflin Co. Boston. 1998. editor. ISBN 9780395868492, OCLC 38450789
- Struggle for Mastery: Disfranchisement in the South, 1888–1908. University of North Carolina Press. 2001. ISBN 9780807849095.
- Pursuit of Unity: A Political History of the American South. University of North Carolina Press. 2009. ISBN 9780807872284.
- The Southern Political Tradition. LSU Press. 2012. ISBN 9780807144015.
