= Cultural depictions of Ulysses S. Grant =

The following is a sample of character portrayals of Ulysses S. Grant in popular entertainment.

== Film ==
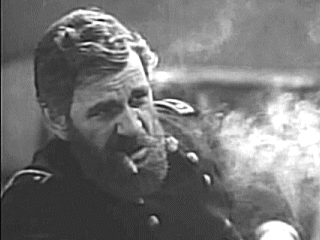
E. Alyn Warren as Grant in Abraham Lincoln (1930)

Grant is the third most popular American president to be portrayed in movies, films, or cinema, his character appearing in 35 movies. He is often portrayed as a drunkard, which is historically inaccurate. Portrayals include:

- The Birth of a Nation (1915), played by Donald Crisp
- E. Alyn Warren played Grant in
  - Abraham Lincoln (1930)
  - Secret Service (1931)
  - Operator 13 (1934)
- Joseph Crehan played Grant in
  - Union Pacific (1939)
  - They Died with their Boots On (1941)
  - The Adventures of Mark Twain (1944)
  - Silver River (1948)
- Tennessee Johnson (1942), played by Harrison Greene
- From the Earth to the Moon (1958), played by Morris Ankrum
- How the West Was Won (1962), played by Harry Morgan
- The Legend of the Lone Ranger (1981), played by Jason Robards
- Wild Wild West (1999), played by Kevin Kline
- Jonah Hex (2010), played by Aidan Quinn
- Lincoln (2012), played by Jared Harris
- Field of Lost Shoes (2014), played by Tom Skerritt

== Television ==
- Wagon Train, "The Colter Craven Story", aired November 23, 1960, portrayed by Paul Birch
- The Wild Wild West, aired on CBS, 1965–1969, portrayed by Roy Engel
- Branded, "The Assassins: Part One", aired March 27, 1966, portrayed by William Bryant "The Assassins: Part Two", aired April 3, 1966, portrayed by William Bryant
- Lincoln, 1974, portrayed by Norman Burton
- The Life and Times of Grizzly Adams, aired on NBC, 1978, in its episode 2-20 "The Stranger" shows a young Captain Grant, portrayed by Mark Slade.
- The Blue and the Gray, aired on CBS, 1982, portrayed by Rip Torn
- North and South, 1985-1986/1994, portrayed by Mark Moses, Anthony Zerbe and Rutherford Cravens
- Lincoln, 1988, portrayed by James Gammon
- The Civil War, aired on PBS, 1990, voiced by Jason Robards
- Lincoln, aired on PBS, 1992, portrayed by Rod Steiger
- Dr. Quinn, Medicine Woman,
- The Day Lincoln Was Shot, aired on TNT, 1998, portrayed by John Ashton.
- Bury My Heart at Wounded Knee, aired on HBO, 2007, portrayed by Senator Fred Thompson.
- Sherman's March, aired on the History Channel, 2007, portrayed by Harry Bulkeley
- Hell on Wheels, aired on AMC, 2013-2016, portrayed by Victor Slezak
- Timeless, "The Assassination of Abraham Lincoln", aired October 10, 2016, portrayed by Terry Lewis
- Legends of Tomorrow, "Abominations", aired November 3, 2016, portrayed by John Churchill
- Grant, a History Channel miniseries which aired from May 25-27, 2020, portrayed by Justin Salinger. In the History Channel miniseries Abraham Lincoln which aired February 20-22, 2022, Salinger reprised his portrayal of Grant in the third episode, entitled "Saving the Union."
- The Gray House, miniseries aired on Amazon Prime from February 26th, 2026, portrayed by Marc Jenner
