= John Y. Simon =

American historian (1933–2008)

- Born: June 25, 1933; Highland Park, Illinois
- Died: July 8, 2008 (aged 75); Carbondale, Illinois

Academic work
- Main interests: American Civil War, Ulysses S. Grant and the Grant family, Abraham Lincoln, documentary editing, Illinois History
- Notable works: The Papers of Ulysses S. Grant, 31 volumes of selected correspondence

John Younker Simon (June 25, 1933 – July 8, 2008) was an American Civil War scholar known for the documentary editing of the papers of Ulysses S. Grant.

== Biography ==
Born in Highland Park, Illinois, to Jane Younker and Jay Simon, he was on the history faculty of Southern Illinois University Carbondale, for 44 years. Simon had MA and PhD history degrees from Harvard University. As a founding member of the Ulysses S. Grant Association, he began compiling Grant's papers while still a Ph.D. student and continued to accumulate and compile papers throughout his tenure at Carbondale. He received the Lincoln Prize Special Achievement Award in 2004 from the Civil War Institute at Gettysburg College for his then-24, later 31 volume Grant series. The same year, he also received The Lincoln Forum's Richard Nelson Current Award of Achievement.

In January 2008, Southern Illinois University Carbondale officials locked him out of his office and barred him from campus over a complaint of verbal sexual harassment, which the university later determined to be baseless. He was not permitted to see the details of the complaint. In May 2008, the Ulysses S. Grant Association voted to disassociate itself from Southern Illinois University over the poor handling of Simon's case. He was preparing to teach at Southern Illinois University Edwardsville when he died on July 8, 2008, at the age of 75. Southern Illinois University Carbondale was preparing to officially clear his name and reinstate him at the time of his death. His successor at the Ulysses S. Grant Association was John F. Marszalek, who won a lawsuit against the university to retain control of Grant's files and moved them to Mississippi State University.

== Quotes ==
"(He is) one of the finest people I've ever met." -- Geoffrey Perret, author of Ulysses S. Grant: Soldier & President

== See also ==
- Bibliography of Ulysses S. Grant
