= Adam Badeau =

American diplomat

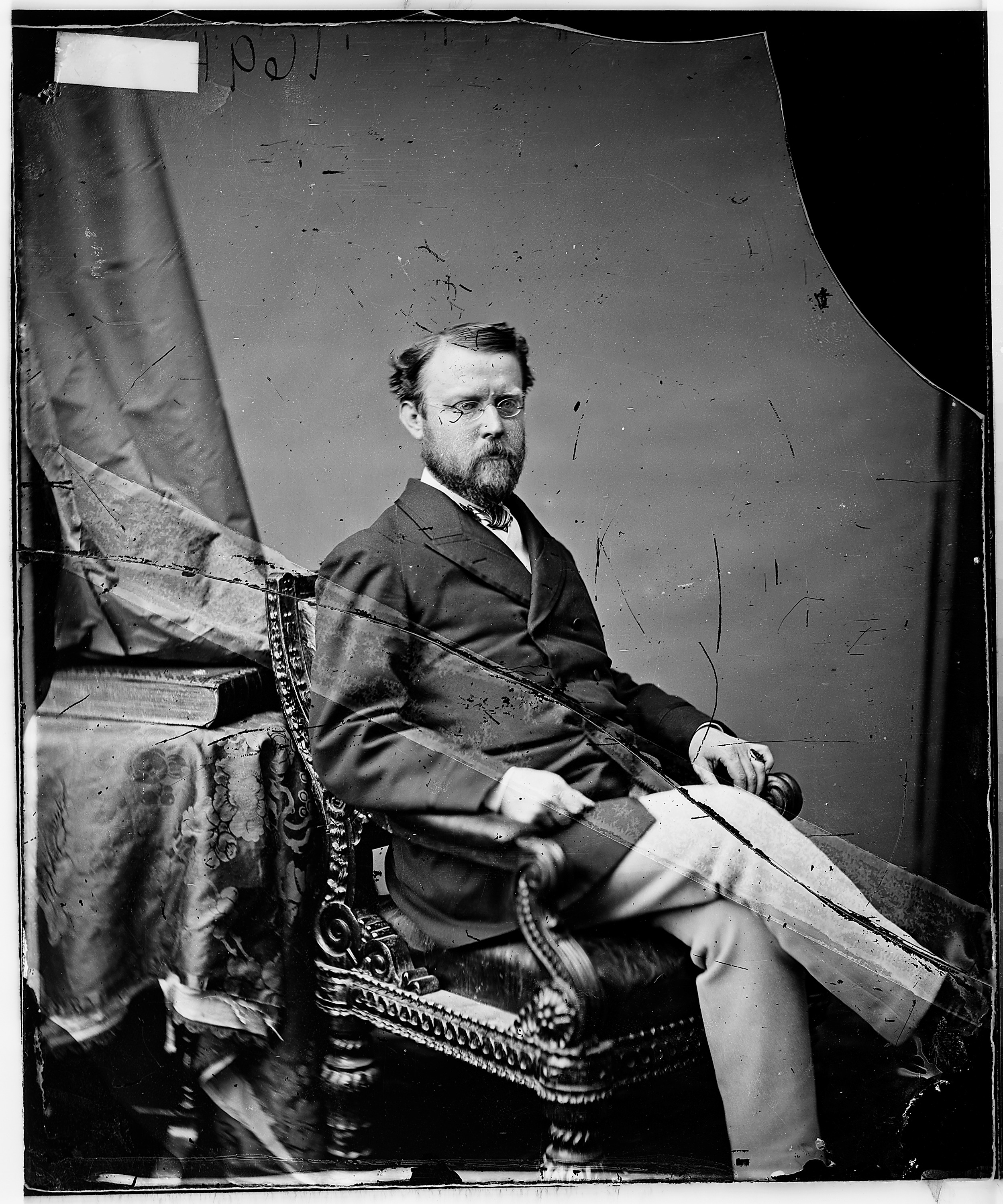
- Born: December 29, 1831; New York City, U.S.
- Died: March 19, 1895 (aged 63); Ridgewood, New Jersey, U.S.
- Burial place: Old Dutch Burying Ground, Section D, Lot 65
- Spouse: Marie E. Niles (m. 1875)
- Military career
- Allegiance: United States of America
- Branch: Union Army; United States Army
- Service years: 1862–1869
- Rank: Captain (actual); Brigadier General (brevet)
- Units: Staff of Thomas W. Sherman; Staff of Ulysses S. Grant
- Conflicts: American Civil War: Siege of Corinth, Mississippi; Defense of New Orleans; Port Hudson, Louisiana; Overland Campaign; Appomattox Campaign
- Other work: Writer; Diplomat

Adam Badeau (December 29, 1831 – March 19, 1895) was an American author, Union Army officer, and diplomat. He is most famous for his service on the staff of Ulysses S. Grant during the American Civil War and his subsequent three-volume biography of Grant. Badeau enjoyed a successful career as a writer and assisted Grant with the research, fact checking, and editing when Grant authored Personal Memoirs of Ulysses S. Grant.

A native of New York City, Badeau was raised and educated in Tarrytown and Sleepy Hollow, and became clerk in the New York City Street Department while studying law. In addition to practicing after he was admitted to the bar, Badeau became a writer, and his early work as a theater critic was carried by Noah's Sunday Times.

Badeau joined the Union Army during the American Civil War, and his abilities as a writer led to his prominence as a staff officer, first for Thomas W. Sherman, and later for Ulysses S. Grant. He took part in several campaigns, and rose from captain to brevet brigadier general. After the war, Badeau became the longtime U.S. Consul in London (1870–1881), and turned down appointments as a U.S. Minister in order to remain in England. From 1882 to 1884, he was the U.S. Consul in Havana, Cuba. Badeau continued to work as a writer, and was a prolific contributor of essays and articles to newspapers and magazines, in addition to being the author of several books, both fiction and non-fiction. In the mid-1880s, he worked with Grant during the preparation of Grant's memoirs, but left the project before it was complete after a dispute about how much Badeau would be paid, and how he would be credited in the book for his research, fact-checking, editing, and proofreading. Before the book had even released, Badeau spread false rumors that the memoirs were ghostwritten by Mark Twain (who was, in actuality, helping Grant publish and advertise them) and later successfully sued Grant's heirs to obtain payment.

Badeau died in Ridgewood, New Jersey, and was buried in the churchyard of the Old Dutch Church of Sleepy Hollow.

== Early life ==
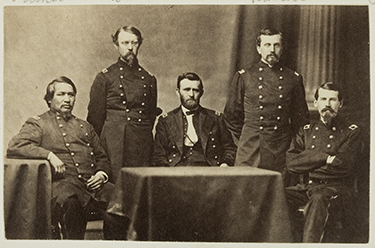
Grant and staff, 1865 L to R: Parker, Badeau, Grant, Babcock, Porter

Adam Badeau was born in New York City on December 29, 1831. He was first educated by private tutors before he moved to Tarrytown, where he attended boarding schools. Later he moved to North Tarrytown, now Sleepy Hollow, and became a clerk in New York City's Street Department. He also studied law, and attained admission to the bar in 1855.

In addition, Badeau was a writer, and his work as an essayist and theater critic was published in Noah's Sunday Times.

== Family ==
Badeau was married on April 29, 1875, to Marie Ely Niles. Her father, Nathaniel Niles (1791–1869) was a prominent physician who served as secretary of the U.S. legation and acting chargé d'affaires in Paris, special diplomatic agent to the Austrian Empire, and chargé d'affaires in Sardinia. Her grandfather, Nathaniel Niles (1741–1828) was a member of Congress from Vermont. Her cousin, also named Nathaniel Niles (1835–1917), served as Speaker of the New Jersey General Assembly in 1872.

== Civil War ==
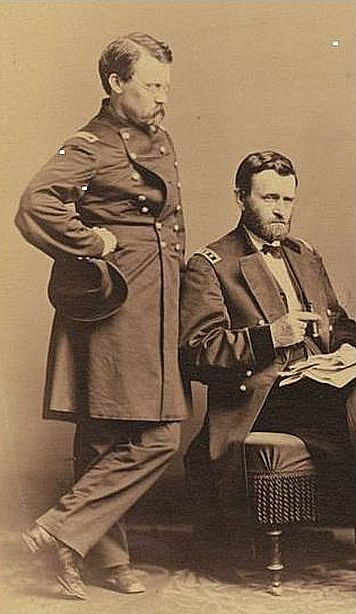
Ulysses S. Grant & Adam Badeau

In 1862, Badeau joined the Union Army during the American Civil War and was commissioned as a captain. As a member of the staff of Thomas W. Sherman, (Note: Not to be confused with William Tecumseh Sherman) he took part in the Siege of Corinth, Mississippi, the defense of New Orleans, and the Siege of Port Hudson. where he was severely wounded. After his recovery, in March 1864, on the personal recommendation of Grant's adjutant, General John A. Rawlins, Badeau joined the staff of Ulysses S. Grant as a brevet lieutenant colonel and military secretary. During this time Badeau and Grant became close friends. Badeau took part in the Wilderness and Appomattox campaigns, and received promotion to brevet colonel. He remained on Grant's staff until 1869, and left the Army for disability caused by his Port Hudson wound; he held the permanent rank of captain and the brevet rank of brigadier general.

== Post-Civil War ==
Badeau, still on the staff of General Grant, began the first volume of a military history of the general, who vetted the manuscript as it was being written. Soon after Grant assumed the Presidency, General Badeau was sent to London and served as Secretary of Legation in the United States embassy in London, England, from May to December 1869, where he could continue working on Grant's military history. Early in the next year he was made bearer of government dispatches to Madrid, then in May he was returned to London as Consul in 1870 and served in that capacity until September, 1881. and U.S. During that time he was granted a leave of absence from 1877 to 1878, when he accompanied Grant on a portion of Grant's trip around the world. While Badeau lived in England, he received Grant as a visitor on several occasions during the trip.

In 1875 Badeau was nominated as Minister to Belgium, and in 1881 he received appointment as Minister to Denmark, but he declined both. From 1882 to 1884 he was U.S. Consul in Havana, Cuba. Badeau resigned this appointment after alleging that officials in the State Department were corrupt in their dealings with Cuba and Spain, and stating that the department took no action after he made his charges.

Badeau then aided Grant in the preparation of Grant's memoirs, but Grant dismissed him before the book was finished after they argued over the details of the legal agreement specifying how much Badeau would be paid and how he would be credited for his editing, research and fact checking. A bitter quarrel lay behind the creation of this agreement – one that would continue even after Grant's death. Grant was surprised when Badeau expressed his complaints and made demands of Grant. Among other concerns, Badeau had two main points of contention with Grant. The first, having committed much of his time and effort in assisting Grant, Badeau maintained that he had been detained from many of his other involvements for several months. The second, realizing that Grant's memoirs was going to be a monumental success, he feared that his multi-volume work on Grant would be obscured in the wake of their publication and release. Grant had earlier thought that it would be unfair to publish anything that would detract from Badeau's work.

"In consideration of the fact that the book which I am now engaged upon will be in competition with Badeau's History of my Campaigns, which was written with my consent and with the expectation that it would take the place of all I would have to say on the subject.
In further consideration of the fact that I shall use maps which he had prepared with great care, and at great expense, as the basis of my maps; in further consideration of the assistance which he is to give, in the preparation of my forthcoming book, I have voluntarily stipulated as as [sic] small compensation for his various services rendered to me, proposed and to propose and bind myself, to give him, General Badeau, Five thousand dollars (5,000) from the first twenty thousand dollars (20,000) realized from the sale of my book, and an additional five thousand dollars (5,000) from the next ten thousand dollars (10,000) so realized."

— Adam Badeau

Grant signed on 7 February 1885. A month later Badeau added his signature, and recorded the receipt of Grant's first payment: "Received of Genl. U. S. Grant $250, my share of $1,000 received by him this day on account of his book. 3 East 66th St. New York. March 2, 1885." As Grant's Memoirs approached completion, having benefited from Badeau's extensive rewriting and additions to its earlier sections, he became convinced that sales would likely go far higher than the $30,000 envisioned in this agreement. With Grant failing badly, Badeau proposed a new arrangement in April 1885: he would complete the work at the price of $1,000 a month, plus 10% of the profits. Grant thought the offer too advantageous to Badeau and was additionally annoyed by press leaks that painted Badeau as the true author of the forthcoming work. Grant broke off relations with his long-time aide and refused to pay him the $10,000 called for in their agreement. When the sales of the Memoirs skyrocketed past $30,000—they eventually brought $450,000—Badeau sued to get his money. Eventually Mrs. Grant paid him the originally agreed upon $10,000 plus interest of $1,200 (see Brooks D. Simpson article on Badeau in American National Biography). (He subsequently settled with Grant's son Frederick for $10,000, or about $250,000 in 2012 dollars.)

== Author and editorialist ==
Badeau was acquainted with many famous people and celebrities of his day, including Ulysses S. Grant and Edwin Booth. He was a prolific author of both fiction and non-fiction, and besides newspaper columns and magazine articles, his works included: The Vagabond (1859); a three volume Military History of Ulysses S. Grant (1881); Aristocracy in England (1885); Conspiracy: A Cuban Romance (1885); and Grant in Peace: From Appomattox to Mount McGregor (1887); It was subtitled A Personal Memoir, a work that covered Grant's political and social involvements with such notable people as General Philip Sheridan, Secretary of War Edwin M. Stanton, Secretary of State Hamilton Fish, and others. Badeau wrote for the New York Sunday Times under the nom de plume "The Vagabond".

== Final years ==
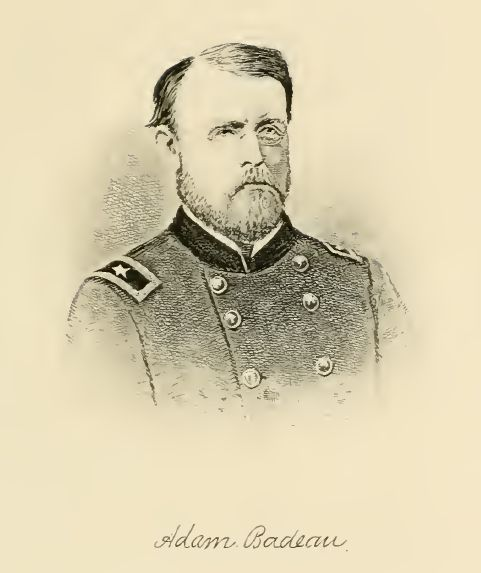
Illustration of Adam Badeau in later years

In his final years Badeau continued writing, frequently contributing to various magazines and periodicals and chronicled the various war time events he participated in. His frequent involvement as a writer caused strain on his eyes and he soon developed cataracts during the winter of 1894-1895 where he subsequently underwent successive operations for their removal, which undermined his physical strength. He finally succumbed to apoplexy, and died suddenly on March 19, 1895, in Ridgewood, New Jersey, at the age of 63 and was buried at the Old Dutch Burying Ground in North Tarrytown (now Sleepy Hollow, New York).

== See also ==
- Bibliography of the American Civil War
- Bibliography of Ulysses S. Grant
- List of Union generals
