= Joan Waugh =

American historian

- Education: University of California, Los Angeles
- Occupation: History professor
- Writing career
- Genres: non-fiction, biography

Joan Waugh is an American historian and academic on the faculty at University of California, Los Angeles. She specializes in 19th-century American history and is an expert on the American Civil War, the aftermath, and the Gilded Age.

== Life ==
Waugh graduated from UCLA.

She has written books such as U.S. Grant: American Hero, American Myth, Unsentimental Reformer: The Life of Josephine Shaw Lowell (1998), The Memory of the Civil War in American Culture (2004), and The American War: A History of the Civil War Era (2015), co-authored with Gary W. Gallagher. Waugh has also written essays on Civil War topics, including Ulysses Grant, on whom she has commented sympathetically.

Waugh has given numerous lectures at universities, and along with Gallagher, she has been involved in conferences on the Civil War at the Huntington Library.
