= William S. McFeely =

American historian (1930–2019)

- Born: William Shield McFeely; September 25, 1930; New York City, U.S.
- Died: December 11, 2019 (aged 89); Sleepy Hollow, New York, U.S.
- Education: Amherst College; Yale University
- Occupation: Historian

William Shield McFeely (September 25, 1930 – December 11, 2019) was an American historian known for his Pulitzer Prize-winning 1981 biography of Ulysses S. Grant, as well as his contributions to a reevaluation of the Reconstruction era, and for advancing the field of African-American history. He retired as the Abraham Baldwin Professor of the Humanities emeritus at the University of Georgia in 1997, and was affiliated with Harvard University since 2006.

== Life and career ==
McFeely was born in New York City, the son of William C. McFeely, an executive with Grand Union supermarkets, and Marguerite McFeely (née Shield), a homemaker. He graduated from Ramsey High School, in New Jersey. After earning a B.A. at Amherst College in 1952, he worked for the First National City Bank of New York for eight years, before deciding to pursue graduate work in American studies at Yale University, where he received his Ph.D. in 1966. At Yale, he studied with, among others, C. Vann Woodward, whose book The Strange Career of Jim Crow was a staple of the Civil Rights Movement. Like Woodward, he sought to employ history in the service of civil rights. His dissertation, later the 1968 book Yankee Stepfather, explored the ill-fated Freedmen's Bureau which was created to help ex-slaves after the Civil War.

McFeely taught at Yale until 1970, during the tumultuous years of the American Civil Rights Movement and Black Power movements, and was instrumental in creating the African-American studies program there, at a time when such programs were still controversial. One of the students in his class was Henry Louis Gates Jr., later the director of the Hutchins Center for African & African American Research at Harvard University and Professor at Harvard.

He taught for 16 years at Mount Holyoke College before joining the University of Georgia in 1986 as the Constance E. Smith Fellow. McFeely won the 1982 Pulitzer Prize for Biography or Autobiography for his 1981 biography of Ulysses S. Grant, which portrayed the general and president in a harsh light. He concluded that Grant "did not rise above limited talents or inspire others to do so in ways that make his administration a credit to American politics."

McFeely retired in 1997. He was a fellow at Harvard's Radcliffe Institute for Advanced Study during the 2006–2007 academic year, where he studied Henry Adams and his wife Clover Adams, and Clarence King and his wife Ada Copeland King. He was a visiting scholar and associate member of Harvard's Afro-American Studies Department and an associate of their Humanities Center.

McFeely died of idiopathic pulmonary fibrosis on December 11, 2019, at his home in Sleepy Hollow, New York, at the age of 89.

== Awards and honors ==
- 1982 Pulitzer Prize for Biography or Autobiography for Grant: A Biography
- 1982 Francis Parkman Prize for Grant: A Biography
- Member, American Academy of Arts and Sciences (since 1987)
- The Lincoln Prize 1992 for Frederick Douglass (based upon the life of Frederick Douglass).
- 1992 Avery O. Craven Award from the Organization of American Historians.

== Select scholarship ==
- Yankee Stepfather: General O.O. Howard and the Freedmen (W. W. Norton, 1968)
- Grant: A Biography (W. W. Norton, 1981)
- Frederick Douglass (W. W. Norton, 1990)
- Sapelo's People: A Long Walk into Freedom (W. W. Norton, 1994)
- Proximity to Death (W. W. Norton, 2000)
- Portrait: The Life of Thomas Eakins (W. W. Norton, 2007)

== See also ==
- List of historians
