= Early life and career of Ulysses S. Grant =

Ulysses S. Grant
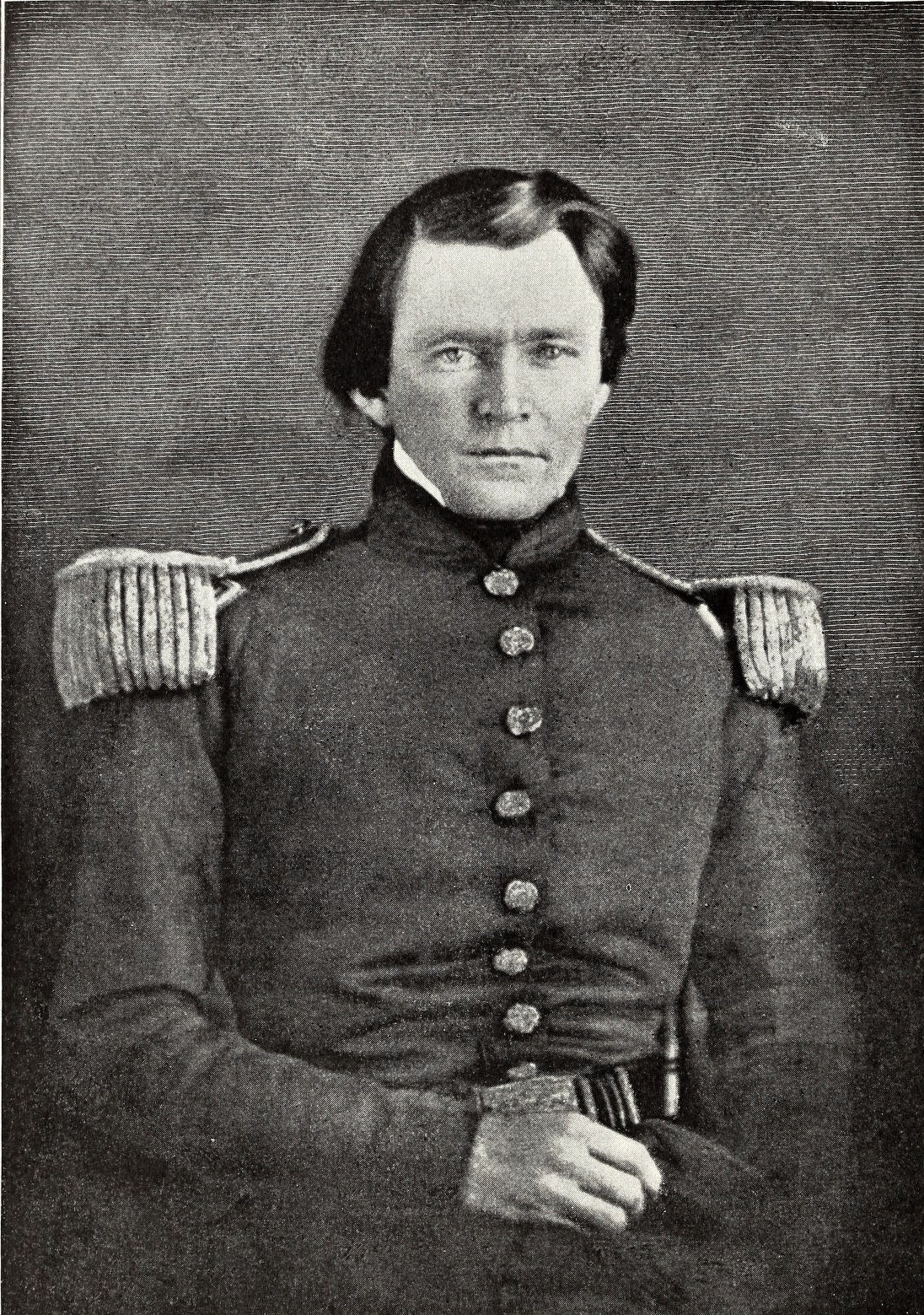
- Grant as a young officer, c. 1845–1847

18th President of the United States
- In office March 4, 1869 – March 4, 1877

Personal details
- Born: Hiram Ulysses Grant; April 27, 1822 Point Pleasant, Ohio, U.S.
- Died: July 23, 1885 (aged 63) Wilton, New York, U.S.
- Resting place: General Grant National Memorial; Manhattan, New York

Ulysses S. Grant was the first born son of Jesse Root Grant and Hannah Simpson Grant. Grant was born in Point Pleasant, Ohio and he was educated in both private and public schools or academies and was later known to be an avid reader. Grant was raised as a Methodist, but uncommon for his time, he was not baptized or forced to attend church by his parents. Growing up in a middle-class family and supported by his father's tanneries, he sought a different career in the military. He was appointed to West Point by Ohio Congressman Thomas L. Hamer. It was Hamer who gave Grant the name Ulysses S. Grant when Grant entered West Point as a plebe in 1839. After four years at West Point, he was stationed in Missouri, where he met his future wife, Julia Dent. In 1846, Grant served in the Mexican–American War, where he was brevetted for bravery. There he fought in Mexico and learned under two commanders, Zachary Taylor and Winfield Scott. Upon his return to the United States, he married Julia and started a family.

After the war, Grant was assigned to posts in New York and Michigan before traveling west to a posting at Fort Vancouver in the Pacific Northwest and at Fort Humboldt in present-day Northern California. On his journey to California by ship, Grant compassionately aided victims of a cholera epidemic while he was traveling through Panama, arriving in San Francisco in 1853, during the California Gold Rush. Grant's tenure in the Pacific Northwest included the aftermath of the Cayuse War. Grant's various attempts at speculation ventures failed in his effort to support Julia and his family. While stationed at Fort Humboldt Grant became lonely and depressed and he began to drink. After accusations of drunkenness while on duty at Fort Humboldt, Grant was compelled to resign and returned to Missouri and his family. Six years of civilian life were difficult for Grant, as he had little aptitude for business or farming, and was devastated by the Panic of 1857. In 1859, the family moved again, to Galena, Illinois, where Grant had a job as a clerk in his father's leather shop. He worked there until 1861, when the American Civil War began.

== Ancestry ==
Grant was of English and Ulster Scots ancestry; his immigrant ancestor Mathew Grant arrived with Puritans from England in the 1630s. Grant's paternal great grandmother Suzanna Delano, of French origin, was the granddaughter of Jonathan Delano (1647–1720), 7th child of Philippe de La Noye (1602–1681). Philippe was descended from the illustrious House of Lannoy, and was one of the Fortune's passengers who landed at Plymouth in November 1621, joining the first settlers of the Mayflower. The offspring of the paternal uncle of Suzanna, Thomas Delano (born 1704), gave a few decades later another president of the United States, Franklin D. Roosevelt. His mother descended from Presbyterian immigrants from County Tyrone, Ireland (where the ancestral family home still stands in Ballygawley) to Bucks County, Pennsylvania.

== Early life and family ==
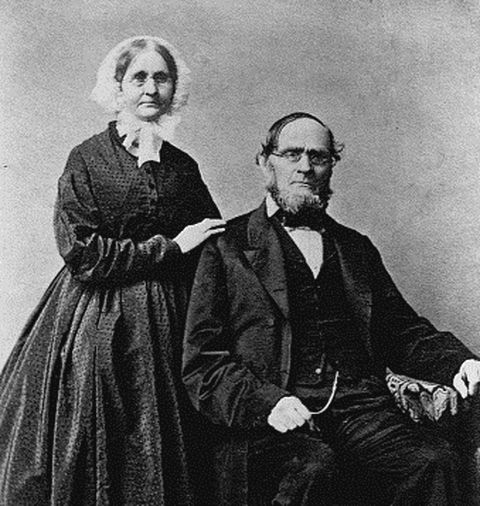
Grant's parents Jesse and Hannah Grant Photo 1870

Hiram Ulysses Grant was born in Point Pleasant, Ohio on April 27, 1822. Point Pleasant was located in the southwestern corner of Ohio near Cincinnati. His father Jesse Root Grant (1794–1873) was a self-reliant tanner and businessman, and his mother was Hannah (Simpson) Grant (1798–1883). Grant was Jesse's and Hannah's first child. Both Jesse and Hannah were natives of Pennsylvania. In the fall of 1823, the family moved to the village of Georgetown in Brown County, Ohio, where they had five more children.

At the age of five, young Grant began his formal education, starting at a subscription school and later was enrolled in two private schools. In the winter of 1836–1837, Grant was a student at Maysville Seminary, and in the autumn of 1838 he attended John Rankin's academy. Raised in a Methodist family devoid of religious pretentiousness, Grant prayed privately and was not an official member of the church. Unlike his younger siblings, Grant was never disciplined, baptized, or forced to attend church by his parents. One of his biographers suggests that Grant inherited a degree of introversion from his reserved, even "uncommonly detached" mother (she did not visit the White House during her son's presidency). At home, Grant assumed the duties which were expected of him as a young man, and they primarily included maintenance of the firewood supply; he thereby developed a noteworthy ability to work with, and control, horses which were in his charge, and he used it to provide transportation as a vocation during his youth.

== West Point (1839–1843) ==
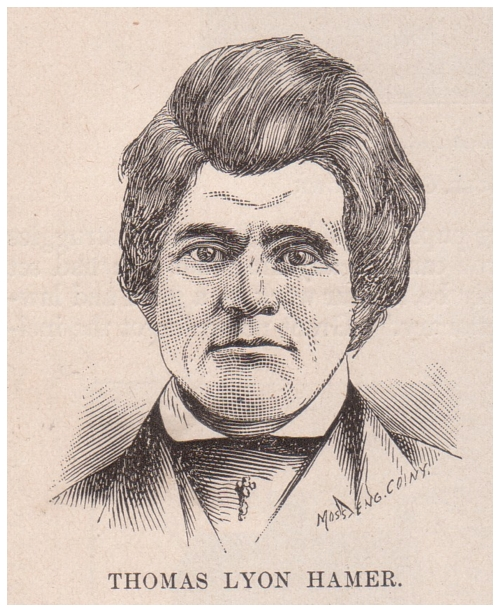
Congressman Thomas L. Hamer nominated Grant to West Point.

At the age of 17, with the help of his father, Grant was nominated for a position at the United States Military Academy (USMA) at West Point, New York by Congressman Thomas L. Hamer. Hamer mistakenly nominated him as "Ulysses S. Grant of Ohio". At West Point, he adopted this name, but only with a middle initial. Among his army colleagues at the academy, his nickname became "Sam" because the initials "U.S." also stood for "Uncle Sam". The "S", according to Grant, did not stand for anything, though Hamer had used it to abbreviate his mother's maiden name. The influence of Grant's family brought about the appointment to West Point, while Grant himself later recalled that "a military life had no charms for me". Grant stood 5 feet 1 inches and weighed 117 lbs when he entered West Point. Grant later said that he was lax in his studies, but he achieved excellent grades in mathematics and geology. Although Grant had a quiet nature, he did establish a few intimate friends at West Point, including Frederick Tracy Dent and Rufus Ingalls. He joined a fraternity group known as the Twelve in One, and was highly esteemed by his classmates. While not excelling scholastically, Grant studied under Romantic artist Robert Walter Weir and produced nine surviving artworks. He also established a reputation as a fearless and expert horseman, setting an equestrian high-jump record that stood almost 25 years. He graduated in 1843, ranking 21st in a class of 29. Grant later recalled that his departure from West Point was of the happiest of his times and that he had intended to resign his commission after serving the minimum term of obligated duty. Despite his excellent horsemanship, he was not assigned to the cavalry, as assignments were determined by class rank, not aptitude. Grant was instead assigned as a regimental quartermaster, managing supplies and equipment in the 4th Infantry Regiment, with the rank of brevet second lieutenant.

== First assignment (1843–1846) ==
Grant's first assignment after graduation took him to the Jefferson Barracks near St. Louis, Missouri. After recuperating from an illness that left him thin and weak, Grant reported there in September 1843. It was the nation's largest military bastion in the West, commanded by Colonel Stephen W. Kearny. Grant was happy with his new commander, but still looked forward to the end of his military service. During this period, Grant had entertained the idea of becoming a mathematics teacher following his military service and spent much of his free time studying advanced algebra, geometry, and trigonometry. Grant spent some of his time in Missouri visiting the family of his West Point classmate, Frederick Dent, and getting to know Dent's sister, Julia; the two became secretly engaged in 1844.

== Mexican–American War (1846–1848) ==
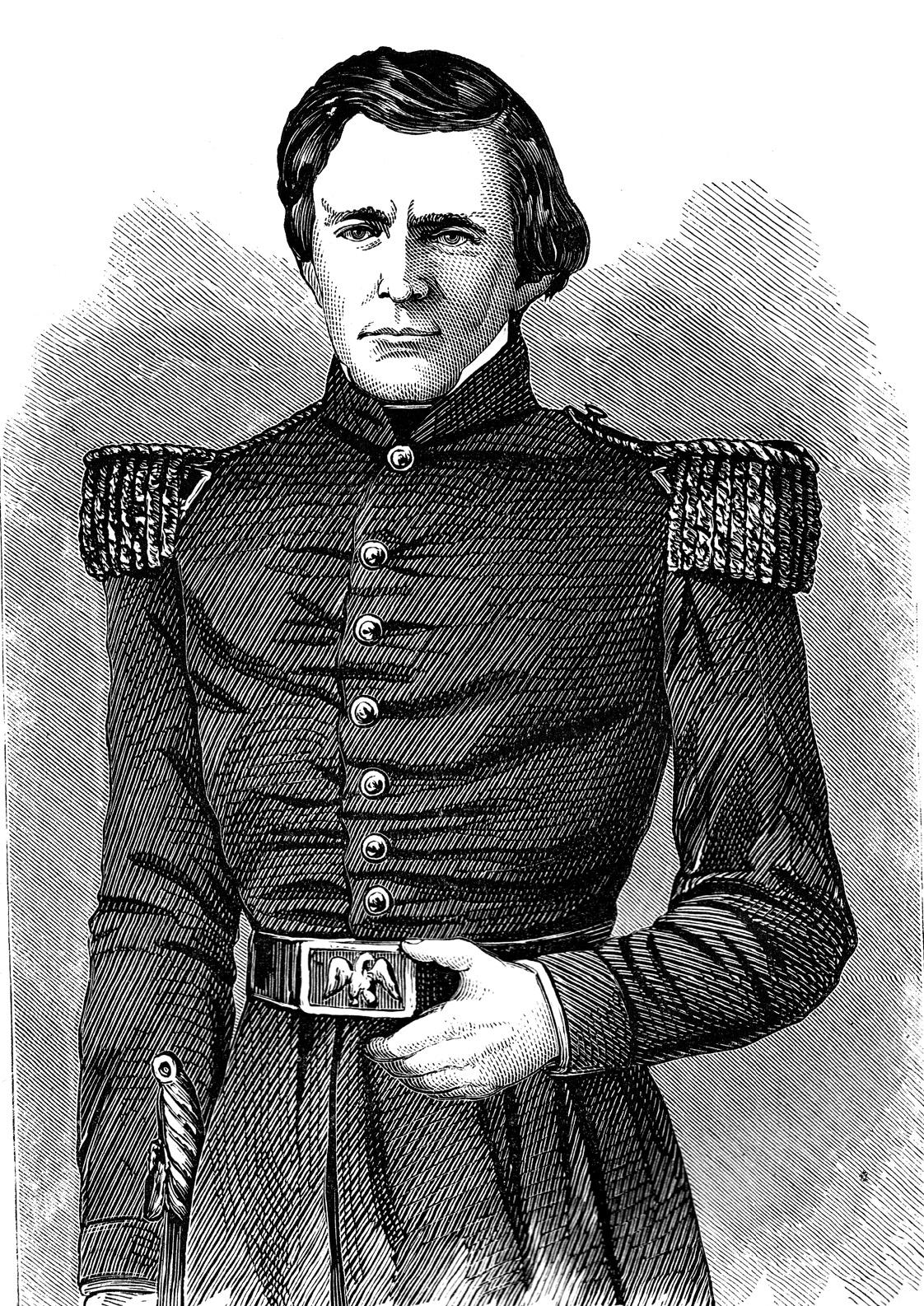
Second lieutenant U.S. Grant in 1843

Rising tensions with Mexico saw Grant's unit shifted to Louisiana that year as a part of the Army of Observation under Major General Zachary Taylor. President James K. Polk ordered Taylor south to force the Mexican government to bargain over disputed territory between the United States and Mexico. Grant was in charge of securing hundreds of mules in preparation for the move south. Grant purchased the mules from Mexicans and had the mules branded, but the mules resisted being broken to wear a saddle and pack. Taylor took notice of Grant when Grant jumped in the water to help his men remove oyster beds so ships could advance from Aransas Bay to Corpus Christi, saying he wished he "had more officers like Grant." On March 11, 1846, Grant's Fourth Infantry, part of the Third Brigade, left Corpus Christi, first traveling west and then veering south. Having reached the Rio Grande, both the Mexican and American armies spied on each other. On April 25, the Mexican–American War broke out when Mexican troops fired on and killed 11 American troops, commanded by Captain Seth Thornton, at Rancho de Carricitos. Defending Fort Texas on the Rio Grande, Taylor's army advanced on Palo Alto and Resaca de la Palma.

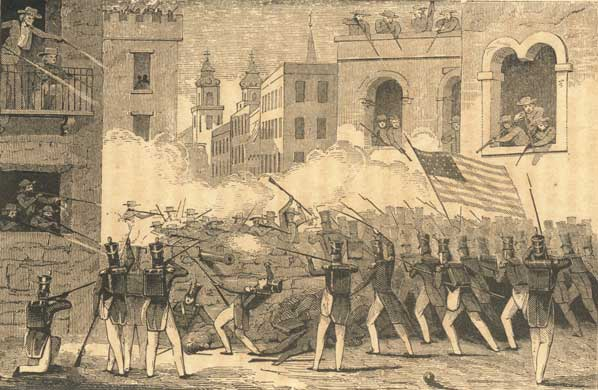
Monterey street fighting during the Mexican–American War. September 1846

Grant's first battle experience came at the Battle of Palo Alto against a substantial Mexican force that intended to flank and attack the American army. Grant did not panic and readied his 1822 musket when Taylor ordered two large artillery guns that fired on the Mexican army, who retreated. The next day the American army followed the retreating Mexican army to Resaca de la Palma. Not content with his responsibilities as a quartermaster, Grant made his way to the front lines to engage in the battle, and participated in the Battle of Resaca de la Palma. Grant led his company in a charge, capturing a Mexican officer and a few of his men, his first victory. Grant later realized the ground he gained and his captives had earlier been won in the battle.

Crossing the Rio Grande, the United States army continued its advance into Mexico. Thousands of American volunteers were incorporated into the U.S. military serving alongside the regular army, including Thomas Hamer, who had nominated Grant to West Point. Starting in September, Taylor and his Army of Invasion, moved south and engaged the Mexican army at the Battle of Monterrey. During the battle, Grant demonstrated his equestrian ability, carrying a dispatch through Monterrey's sniper-lined streets on horseback while mounted in one stirrup.

President James K. Polk, who was wary of Taylor's growing popularity, divided his army, sending some troops (including Grant's unit) to form a new army under Maj. Gen. Winfield Scott. Scott's army landed at Veracruz and advanced toward Mexico City. The army met the Mexican forces at battles of Molino del Rey and Chapultepec outside Mexico City. At the latter battle, Grant dragged a howitzer into a church steeple to bombard nearby Mexican troops. Scott's army was soon into the city, and the Mexicans agreed to peace not long after.

In his memoirs, Grant indicated that he had learned extensively by closely observing the decisions and actions of his commanding officers, particularly admiring Taylor's methods, and in retrospect, he identified with Taylor's style. At the time, he felt that the war was a wrongful one because he believed that territorial gains were designed to spread slavery throughout the nation; writing in 1883, Grant said "I was bitterly opposed to the measure, and to this day, I regard the war, which resulted, as one of the most unjust ever waged by a stronger nation against a weaker nation." He also opined that the later Civil War was inflicted on the nation as punishment for its aggression in Mexico.

== Marriage and family ==
On August 22, 1848, after a four-year engagement, Grant and Julia were married. He and Julia would go on to have four children: Frederick Dent Grant; Ulysses S. "Buck" Grant, Jr.; Ellen Wrenshall "Nellie" Grant; and Jesse Root Grant II. The couple corresponded during his service in Mexico; in one letter Julia shared with him a very pleasurable dream she had of him in a beard, which he was then sporting upon his return after the war.

== Extended military service (1848–1854) ==
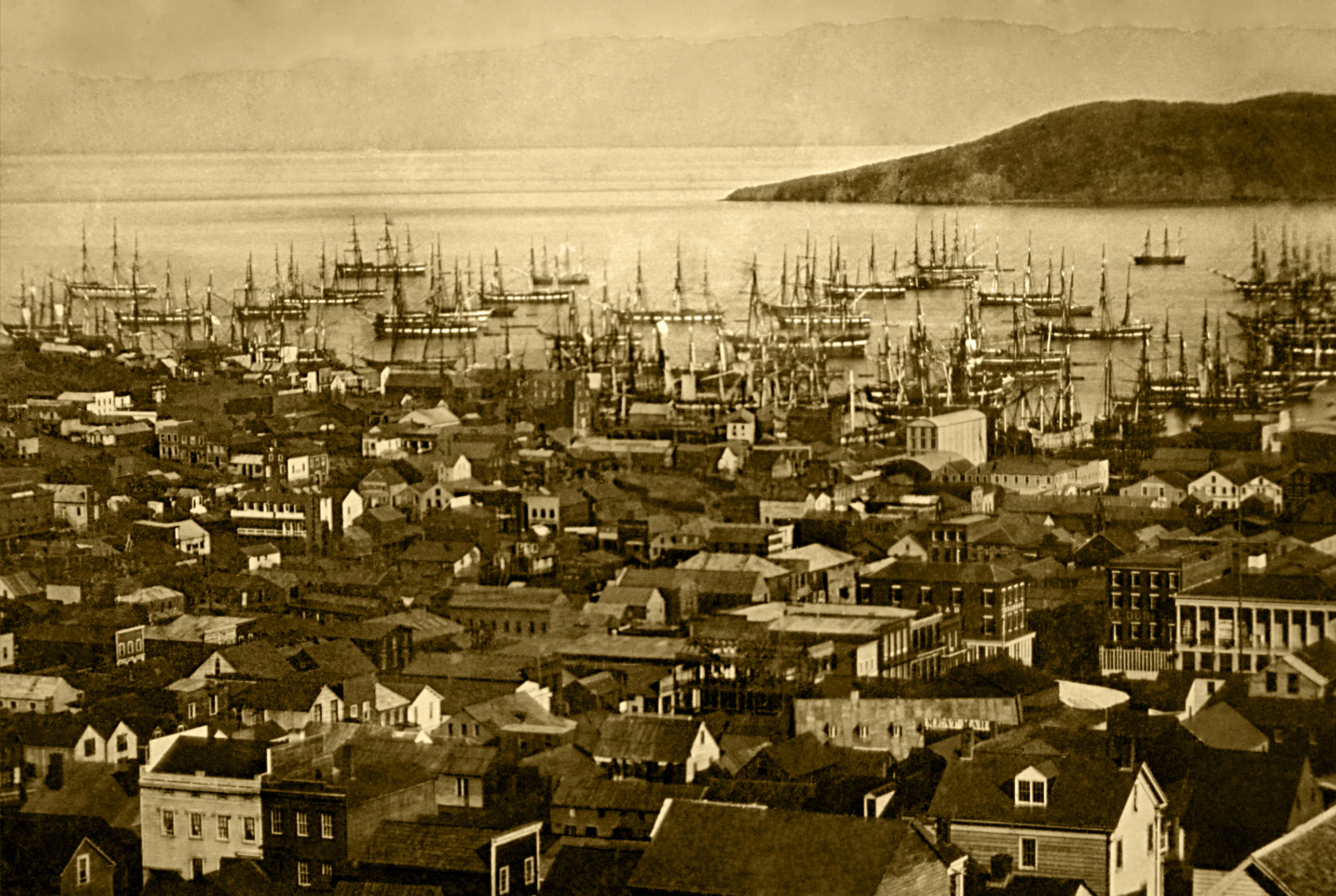
San Francisco harbor during the California Gold Rush. 1850–1851

Although Grant received promotions during the Mexican–American War, the peacetime army offered little for a young officer's advancement. Lieutenant Grant was assigned to several different posts over the ensuing six years. His first post-war assignments took him and Julia to Detroit and Sackets Harbor, New York, the location that made them the happiest. In the spring of 1852, he traveled in to Washington, D.C., in a failed attempt to prevail upon the Congress to rescind an order that he, in his capacity as quartermaster, reimburse the military $1000 in losses incurred on his watch, for which he bore no personal guilt. He was sent west to Fort Vancouver in the Oregon Territory in 1852, initially landing in San Francisco during the height of the California Gold Rush. Julia could not accompany him as she was eight months pregnant with their second child; further, a lieutenant's salary would not support a family on the frontier. The journey proved to be an ordeal due to transportation disruptions and an outbreak of cholera within the entourage while traveling overland through Panama. Grant made use of his organizational skills, arranging makeshift transportation and hospital facilities to take care of the sick. There were 150 4th Infantry fatalities including Grant's long-time friend John H. Gore. After Grant arrived in San Francisco he traveled to Fort Vancouver, continuing his service as quartermaster; the U.S. military was to keep the peace in the Pacific Northwest between settlers and Indians in the aftermath of the Cayuse War.

While on assignment out west and in an effort to supplement a military salary inadequate to support his family, Grant, assuming his work as quartermaster so equipped him, attempted but failed at several business ventures. The business failures in the West confirmed Jesse Grant's belief that his son had no head for business, creating frustration for both father and son. In at least one case Grant had even naively allowed himself to be swindled by a partner. These failures, along with the separation from his family, made for quite an unhappy soldier, husband and son. Rumors began to circulate that Grant was drinking in excess.

In the summer of 1853, Grant was promoted to captain, one of only fifty on active duty, and assigned to command Company F, 4th Infantry, at Fort Humboldt, on the northwest California coast. Without explanation, he shortly thereafter resigned from the army on July 31, 1854. The commanding officer at Fort Humboldt, brevet Lieutenant Colonel Robert C. Buchanan, a strict disciplinarian, had reports that Grant was intoxicated off duty while seated at the pay officer's table. Buchanan had previously warned Grant several times to stop his drinking. In lieu of a court-martial, Buchanan gave Grant an ultimatum to sign a drafted resignation letter. Grant resigned; the War Department stated on his record, "Nothing stands against his good name." Rumors, however, persisted in the regular army of Grant's intemperance. According to biographer McFeely, historians overwhelmingly agree that his intemperance at the time was a fact, though there are no eyewitness reports extant. Two of Grant's lieutenants corroborated this incident and Buchanan confirmed it to another officer in a conversation during the Civil War. Historian Jean Edward Smith says, "The story rings true. Jean Edward Smith maintains Grant's resignation was too sudden to be a calculated decision. Historian William McFeely said that Grant left the army simply because he was "profoundly depressed" and that the evidence as to how much and how often Grant drank remains elusive. Buchanan never mentioned it again until asked about it during the Civil War. The effects and extent of Grant's drinking on his military and public career are debated by historians. Lyle Dorsett said Grant was an "alcoholic" but functioned amazingly well. William Farina maintains Grant's devotion to family kept him from drinking to excess and sinking into debt.

Years later after his resignation, Grant told John Eaton, "the vice of intemperance had not a little to do with my decision to resign." Grant's father, again believing his son's only potential for success to be in the military, tried to get the Secretary of War to rescind the resignation, to no avail.

== Civilian life, poverty, and struggles (1854–1861) ==
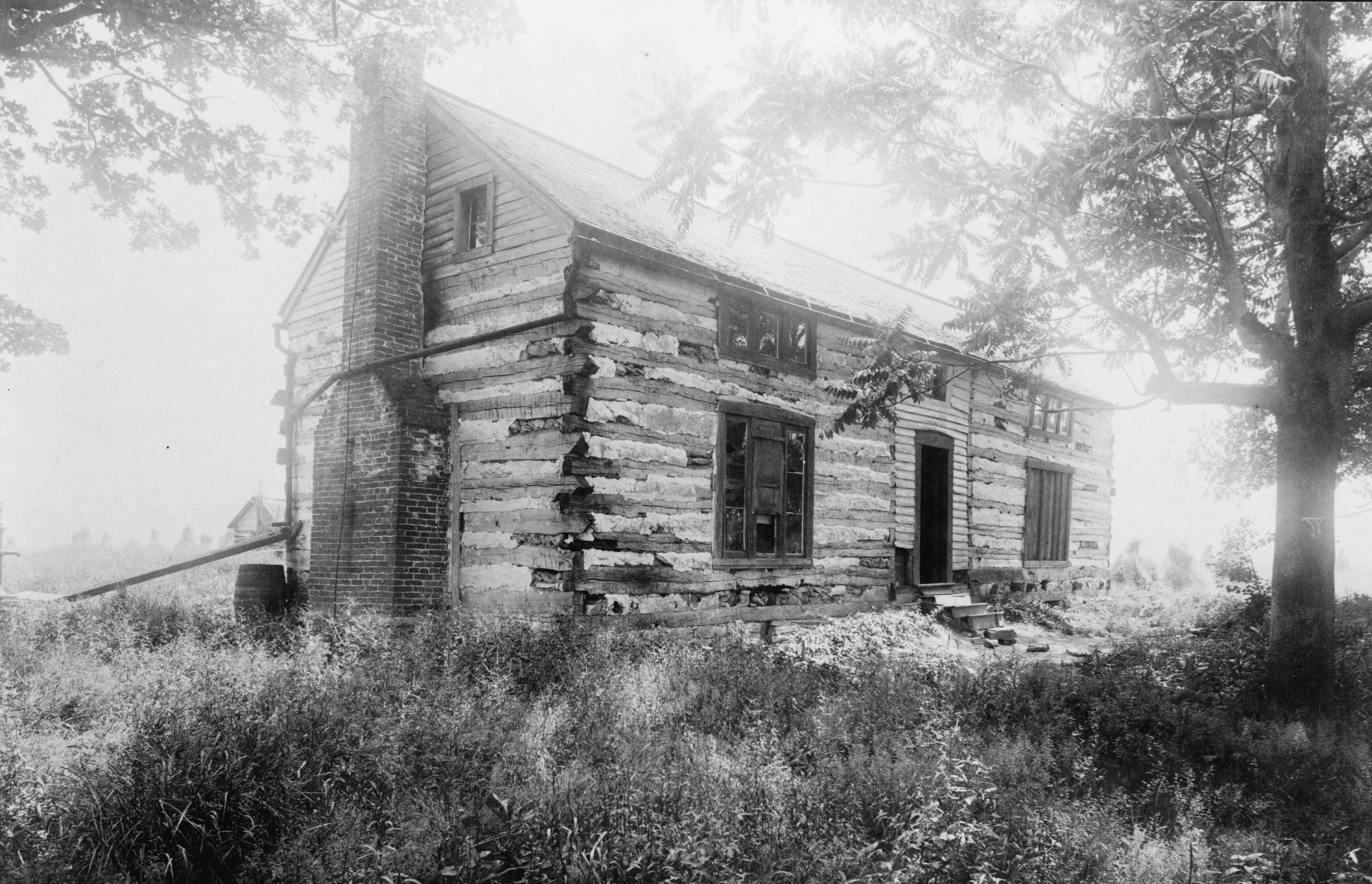
"Hardscrabble" home Grant built in Missouri for his family.

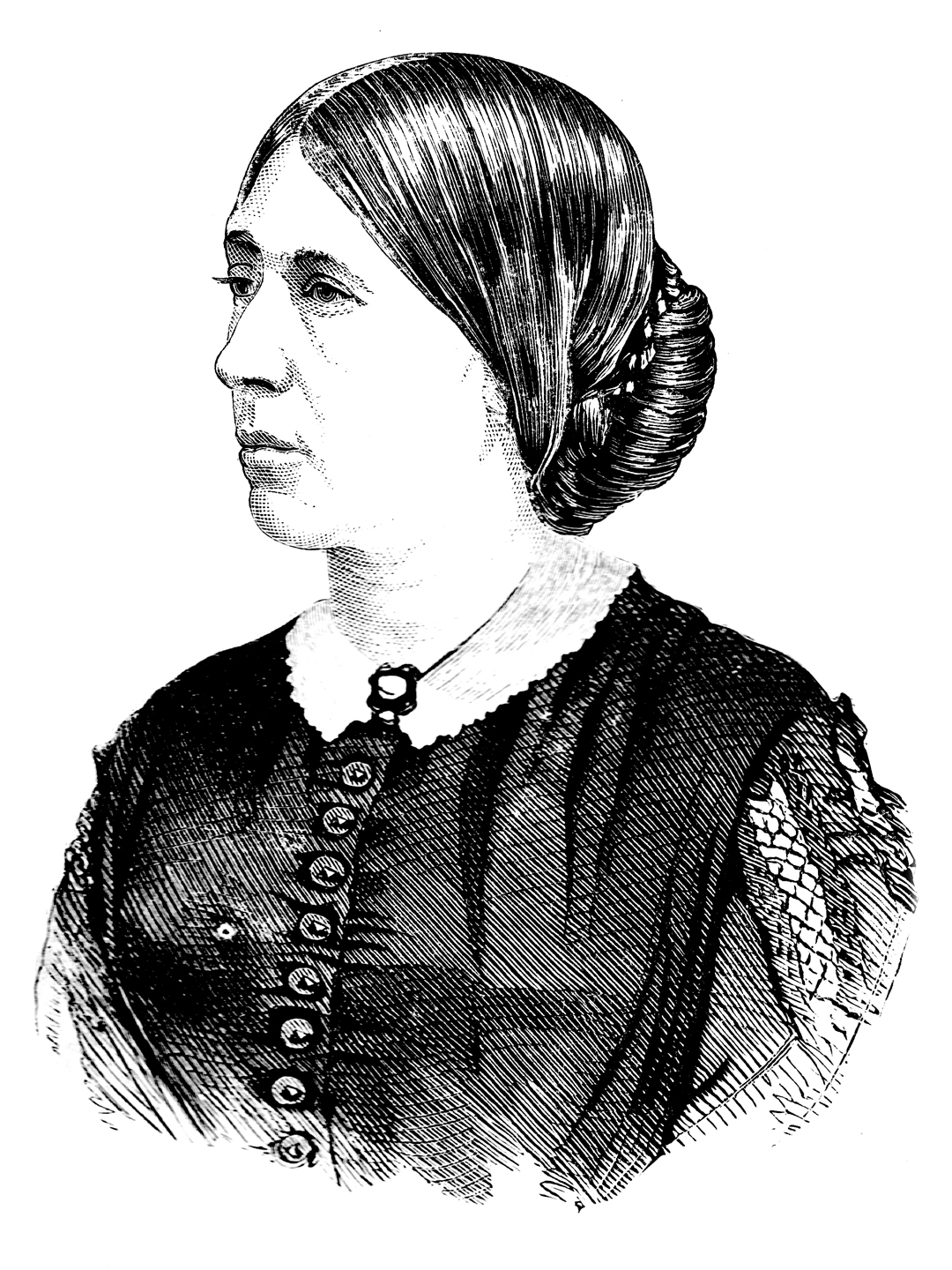
Julia Dent Grant in 1868

At age 32, with no civilian vocation, Grant began to struggle through seven financially lean years and poverty. His father, Jesse, initially offered Grant a position in the Galena, Illinois branch of the tannery business, on condition that Julia and the children, for economic reasons, stay with her parents in Missouri, or Grant's in Kentucky. Ulysses and Julia were adamantly opposed to another separation, and declined the offer. In 1854, Grant farmed on his brother-in-law's property near St. Louis, using slaves owned by Julia's father, but it did not succeed. Two years later, Grant and family moved to a section of his father-in-law's farm; to give his family a home, built a house he called "Hardscrabble". Julia hated the rustic house, which she described as an "unattractive cabin". During this time, Grant also acquired a slave from Julia's father, a thirty-five-year-old man named William Jones. Having met with no success farming, the Grants left the farm when their fourth and final child was born in 1858. Grant freed his slave in 1859 instead of selling him, at a time when slaves commanded a high price and Grant needed money badly. For the next year, the family took a small house in St. Louis where he worked, again without success, with Julia's cousin Harry Boggs, as a bill collector. In 1860 Jesse offered him the job in his tannery in Galena, Illinois, without condition, which Ulysses accepted. The leather shop, "Grant & Perkins", sold harnesses, saddles, and other leather goods and purchased hides from farmers in the prosperous Galena area. He moved his family to Galena before that year.

Although unopposed to slavery at the time, Grant kept his political opinions private and never endorsed any candidate running for public office before the Civil War. His father-in-law was a prominent Democrat in Missouri, a factor that helped derail Grant's bid to become county engineer in 1859, while his own father was an outspoken Republican. In the 1856 election, Grant cast his first presidential vote for the Democratic candidate James Buchanan, saying he was really voting against Fremont, the Republican candidate. In 1860, he favored the Democratic presidential candidate Stephen A. Douglas over Abraham Lincoln, and Lincoln over the alternate Democratic candidate, John C. Breckinridge. Lacking the residency requirements in Illinois at the time, he could not vote. By August 1863, during the Civil War, after the fall of Vicksburg, Grant's political sympathies fully coincided with the Radical Republicans' aggressive prosecution of the war and for the abolition of slavery.

== Sources ==
- Brands, H. W. (2012). The Man Who Saved The Union Ulysses S. Grant in War and Peace. New York: Doubleday.
- Catton, Bruce (2015) [1968]. Grant Takes Command. Boston: Little, Brown. ISBN 978-0-316-13210-7.
- Chernow, Ron (2017). Grant. New York: Penguin Press. ISBN 978-1-5942-0487-6.
- Dorsett, Lyle W. (1983). "The Problem of Ulysses S. Grant's Drinking During the Civil War". Hayes Historical Journal. 4 (2): 37–49.
- Farina, William (2007). Ulysses S. Grant, 1861–1864: His Rise from Obscurity to Military Greatness. Jefferson, NC: McFarland & Co. ISBN 978-0-7864-2977-6.
- Lewis, Lloyd (1950). Captain Sam Grant. Boston: Little, Brown. ISBN 978-0-316-52348-6.
- Longacre, Edward G. (2006). General Ulysses S. Grant The Soldier And The Man. Cambridge, Massachusetts: First Da Capo Press. ISBN 0-306-81269-X.
- McFeely, William S. (1981). Grant: A Biography. Norton. ISBN 0-393-01372-3.
- Simon, John Y. (2002). "Ulysses S. Grant". In Graff, Henry (ed.). The Presidents: A Reference History (7th ed.). Macmillan Library Reference USA. pp. 245–260. ISBN 0-684-80551-0.
- Simpson, Brooks D. (2000). Ulysses S. Grant: Triumph Over Adversity, 1822–1865. Boston, Massachusetts: Houghton Mifflin. ISBN 0-395-65994-9.
- Smith, Jean Edward (2001). Grant. New York, New York: Simon & Schuster. ISBN 0-684-84927-5.
- Welles, Albert (1881). History of the Buell Family. New York, NY: American College for Genealogical Registry, Family History and Heraldry. pp. xi–xii.
- White, Ronald C. (2016). American Ulysses: A Life of Ulysses S. Grant. Random House Publishing Group. ISBN 978-1-5883-6992-5.
