= Hannah Simpson Grant =

Mother of President Ulysses S. Grant

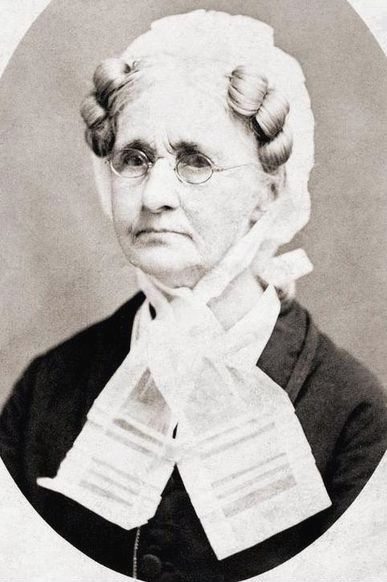
- Grant in 1883
- Born: Hannah Simpson; November 23, 1798; Horsham, Pennsylvania, U.S.
- Died: May 11, 1883 (aged 84); Jersey City, New Jersey, U.S.
- Occupation: Homemaker
- Spouse: Jesse Root Grant (m. 1821; died 1873)
- Children: 6, including Ulysses

Hannah Grant (née Simpson; November 23, 1798 – May 11, 1883) was the mother of Ulysses S. Grant, Commanding General of the Union Army during the American Civil War and the 18th president of the United States. She married Jesse Root Grant in Point Pleasant, Ohio, and was the mother of six children. Little is known about her private life, other than what can be discerned from general and public information. She rarely discussed her son with anyone while he was a general and a president, especially not the press. She was a devoutly religious woman, always reserved and unpretentious in her manner, and she is often considered by historians and others to have had a strong influence on her son Ulysses, who shared similar qualities in character.

== Ancestry and early life ==
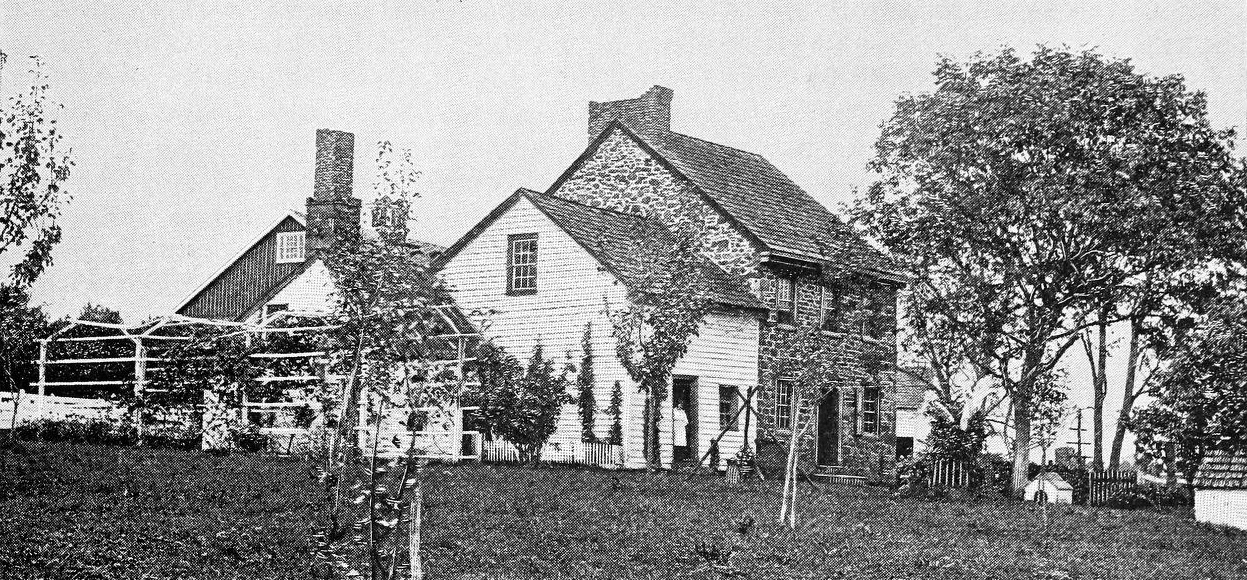
Simpson's childhood home

Hannah Simpson was born on her parents' farm on November 23, 1798, in Horsham, Montgomery County, Pennsylvania, where she grew up. Her grandfather John Simpson was born in a farmhouse outside Ballygawley, County Tyrone, Ireland. In 1760 John Simpson left Ireland, emigrating to Ohio in the United States. From a family of four siblings, she was the second daughter and third child of John Simpson Jr. and Rebecca Simpson, who came from the Simpson family of Scots-Irish Protestants. Her grandfather came to Philadelphia in 1762 and established a farm not far from the city. He fought with George Washington during the American Revolutionary War. He had a son, Hannah's father, who sold the farm in 1817 and moved to Ohio and bought a farm near the Ohio River, not far from Point Pleasant. Hannah was described by friends as slender, above average height, handsome, but not beautiful, with a serious, reserved and steadfast personality.

== Mother of a general and president ==
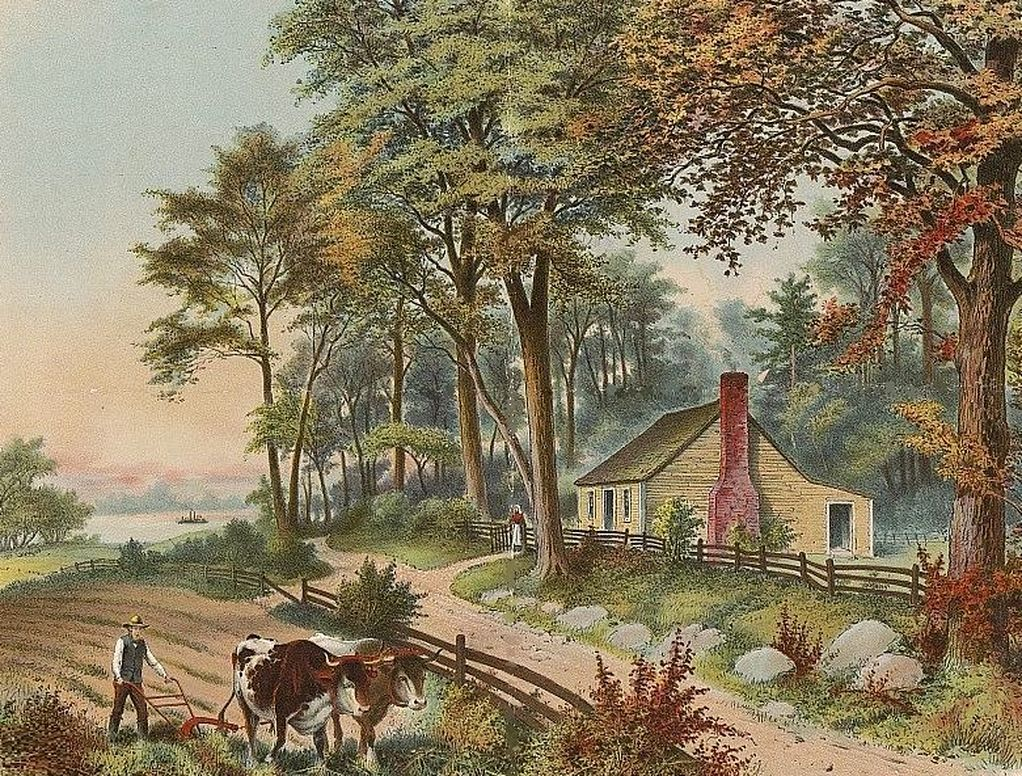
Hannah and Jesse Grant's home in Point Pleasant when Ulysses was born

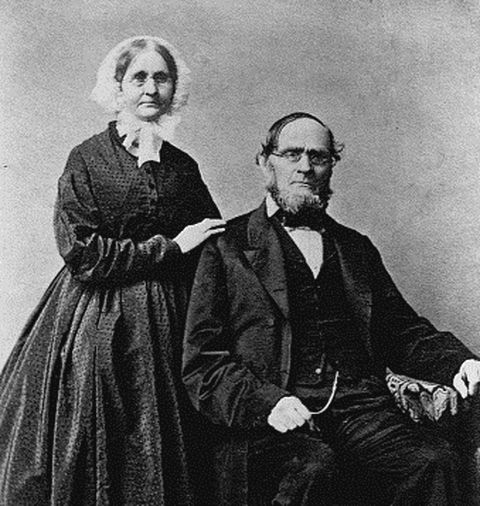
Hannah with husband Jesse

Hannah married Jesse Root Grant on June 25, 1821, and settled into a modest, though attractive, house near the Ohio River in Point Pleasant, Ohio. They were much admired by the townspeople there. Together they had six children – three boys and three girls. She gave birth to the first of her children, Ulysses, on April 27, 1822, about ten months after she was married. As firstborn children were traditionally received with wide family fanfare, deciding a name for her firstborn child became an involved family event for Hannah. Her husband, Jesse, and other family members all had enthusiastic ideas for a suitable name, and subsequently weeks elapsed before a name was chosen. It was finally decided that a name would be chosen by means of a ballot, i.e.by placing names in a hat, a method that Hannah was not very comfortable with. Realizing, however, that her son would likely return home without a name otherwise, Hannah acquiesced to the procedure.

Hannah, being a loyal Democrat, suggested the name of Albert, after Albert Gallatin from her home state of Pennsylvania. (Note: Gallatin was a favorite in the Simpson family because of his central role in Jeffersonian politics as a diplomat and secretary under Thomas Jefferson.) Hannah's mother opted for Ulysses, after an ancient Greek hero, which Jesse seconded. Grant's step-grandmother Sarah Simpson, an educated woman who read French classical literature, also favored the name Ulysses. Finally, at a family gathering, the name Ulysses, was drawn from ballots placed in a hat. Jesse, wanting to honor his wife's father, declared the name for his son would thus be Hiram Ulysses, though he would always refer to him as Ulysses.

When Ulysses was eighteen months old, the family moved to Georgetown, Ohio. Here Hannah gave birth to five more siblings: Simpson, Clara, Orvil, Virginia (known as Jennie), and Mary.

In character, Ulysses was said to have resembled his mother more so than his father, deriving his good nature and calm disposition from her. However, Hannah, though always supportive, was not known as someone for a young boy to turn to for compassionate counsel in times of trouble, usually keeping her affections withdrawn. Hannah and her husband helped to found the Georgetown Methodist Church, which began holding services in 1827. Hannah earnestly had her family attend this church every Sunday. She was never known to argue or boast, and never gossiped about her neighbors or others. Her husband Jesse once bore testimony to her noble-like character, and said of her, "Her steadiness, strength of character have been the stay of the family through life".

During the Civil War her son Ulysses was sometimes criticized for his costly war-time tactics. While her husband Jesse often responded angrily with newspaper editorials, a devoutly religious Hannah remained calm and was confident with the idea that her son was protected by God in the business of saving the Union from what she regarded as a "terrible war".

When Ulysses was elected president in 1868, Hannah, not liking publicity and praise, was not present when Ulysses was sworn in as the 18th president of United States, and never visited the White House during his two terms as president. As she came from a family of Jacksonian Democrats, there was much political speculation about her noted absence. There is only one known interview of her. During the presidency of her son Ulysses, she lived a detached life from him, though she was not estranged from him, as many had assumed.

Hannah's husband, Jesse, died on June 29, 1873, four years after their son Ulysses was sworn in as president in 1869. Often met with inquiries about her famous son, Hannah remained virtually silent about anything to do with Ulysses or the family for the duration of her life.

== Final days ==
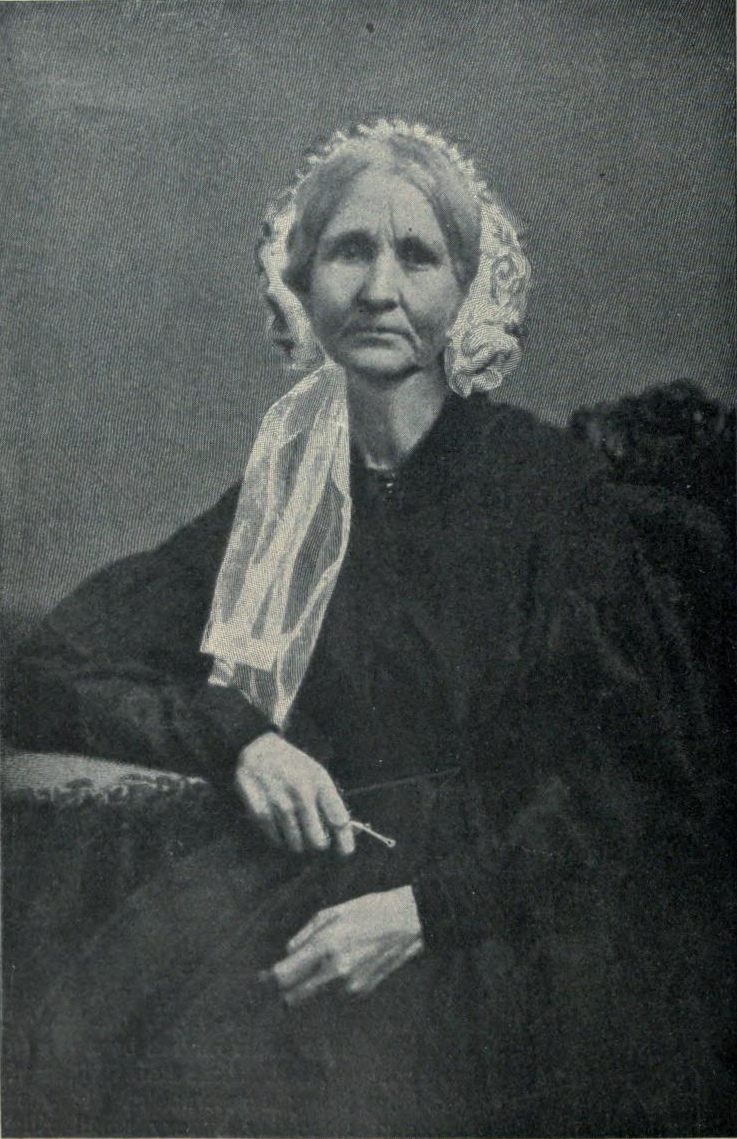
Hannah Simpson Grant

When Hannah's husband, Jesse, died in 1873, she moved in with her daughter, Virginia, wife of Abel Corbin. (Note: Abel Corbin was a business and Treasury associate to then President Grant.)

There is only one known news interview of Hannah which occurred in Jersey City sometime after President Grant's term in office. In response to an inquiry about when she expected to see her son, Ulysses, again, she replied, "Indeed, the newspapers seem to know more about it than we do; at least, so Mrs. Corbin says. For myself, I never read any paper but the Christian Advocate, published in Cincinnati."

Some ten years later Hannah died on May 11, 1883, at the age of 84, at 12:30 in the afternoon, at her home at 582 Pavonia Ave in Jersey City. Up until that time she was considered in good health and her death came unexpectedly. On the morning of her death she was going about her usual business around the house, had read the newspaper and had conversations with her daughter, Mrs. Virginia Grant Corbin, the only other person in the house. At about noon, Hannah began to feel weak and faint and retired to her bed for rest. She continued to grow weak at an alarming rate, where her daughter, not knowing the seriousness of Hannah's condition, went for help a block away, and then sent a telegram notifying her sister, in Philadelphia. When she returned to the house, Hannah was incoherent and within minutes had stopped breathing. News of her death was telegraphed to General Grant, who made the necessary arrangements for her funeral. The funeral was held in Hannah's home with the Reverend Richard from the Simpson Methodist Church conducting the service.

At Hannah's funeral, not wanting to overshadow her memory with his fame, Ulysses advised the pastor that he should "speak of her only as a pure-minded simple-hearted, earnest, Methodist Christian ...", asking him to speak of her only, and to make no reference to himself, asserting his request by maintaining that Hannah had gained nothing by any position he had ever held.

== See also ==
- Ulysses S. Grant Home

== Bibliography ==
- Bunting, Josiah III (2004). Ulysses S. Grant: The American Presidents Series: The 18th President, 1869-1877. Macmillan. ISBN 978-1-4668-2610-6.
- Chernow, Ron (2017). Grant. New York: Penguin Press. ISBN 978-1-59420-487-6.
- Coyle, Cathal (2014). Little Book of Tyrone. The History Pres. ISBN 978-0-7509-6284-1.
- Edmonds, Franklin Spencer (1915). Ulysses S. Grant. Philadelphia, G.W. Jacobs & Company.
- Longacre, Edward G. (2006). General Ulysses S. Grant: The Soldier and the Man. Cambridge, MA: First Da Capo Press. ISBN 978-0-306-81636-9. online free
- McFeely, William S. (1981). Grant: A Biography. Norton. ISBN 0-393-01372-3.
- Smith, Jean Edward (2001). Grant. New York: Simon & Schuster. ISBN 0-684-84927-5.
- Thayer, William M. (1885). From Tannery to the White House: The Life of Ulysses S. Grant: His Boyhood, Youth, Manhood, Public and Private Life and Services. James H. Earle, Boston.
- Waugh, Joan (2009). U.S. Grant: American Hero, American Myth. The University of North Carolina Press. ISBN 978-0-8078-3317-9.
- White, Ronald C. (2016). American Ulysses: A Life of Ulysses S. Grant. Random House Publishing Group. ISBN 978-1-58836-992-5.
- Vault, Victorian (1885). Memoirs Of U. S. Grant (1885).
- "Hannah Simpson Grant (1798-1883)". The Ulysses S. Grant Homepage. 2006.
