= Jesse Root Grant =

Father of US President Grant (1794–1873)

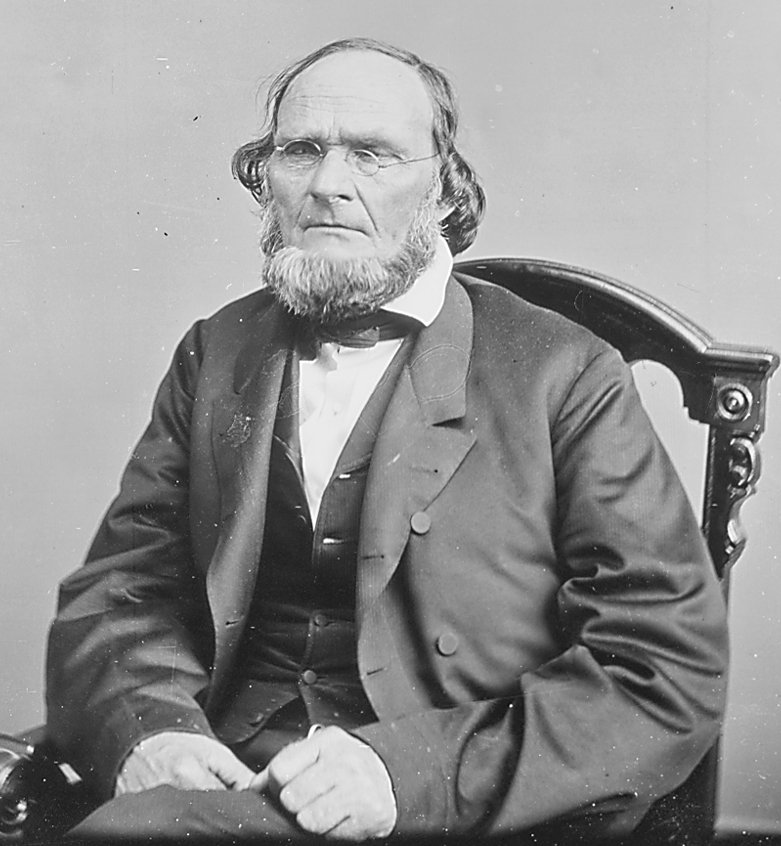
- Grant c. 1860-1865

Mayor of Bethel, Ohio
- In office 1851–1855
- Preceded by: Office created
- Succeeded by: A. Carr

Mayor of Georgetown, Ohio
- In office 1837–1839
- Preceded by: George K. Snyder
- Succeeded by: J. T. Smiley

Personal details
- Born: January 23, 1794 Greensburg, Pennsylvania, U.S.
- Died: June 29, 1873 (aged 79) Covington, Kentucky, U.S.
- Party: Whig
- Spouse: Hannah Simpson Grant (m. 1821)
- Children: 6, including Ulysses
- Parent(s): Noah Grant; Rachel Kelly
- Relatives: Frederick Dent Grant (grandson); Ulysses S. Grant Jr. (grandson); Nellie Grant (granddaughter); Jesse Root Grant II (grandson); Julia Grant Cantacuzène (great-granddaughter); Ulysses S. Grant III (great-grandson); Ulysses S. Grant IV (great-grandson); Algernon Edward Sartoris (great-grandson); Chapman Grant (great-grandson)
- Occupation: Farmer, Tanner, Merchant
- Known for: Editorialist; Abolitionist
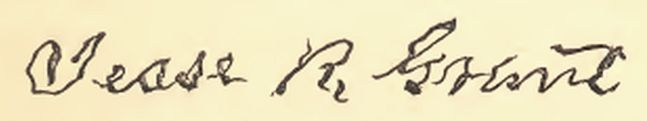
- Signature

Jesse Root Grant (January 23, 1794 – June 29, 1873) was an American farmer, tanner, and successful leather merchant who owned tanneries and leather goods shops in several different states throughout his adult life. He was the father of Ulysses S. Grant and the one who introduced Ulysses to military life at West Point. Jesse was born in Greensburg, Pennsylvania, and was one of seven children. He was a self-made man who rose from poverty to become a wealthy merchant.

At age five, Jesse moved to Ohio with his family, who settled in the Ohio River Valley. Unable to support all his children Jesse's father arranged for his apprenticeship at farms and tanneries during his youth. Jesse married Hannah Simpson Grant and they became the parents of three boys and three girls, with Ulysses being their oldest. Raised in a poor family that was forced to split up and having to work at an early age, Jesse persistently encouraged his sons in the ways of education, industry and hard work, his methods sometimes testing his father-son relationship with Ulysses. As a young man he worked for and came to know Owen Brown (Note: Father of the famous abolitionist John Brown) and soon acquired strong abolitionist sympathies. Jesse was known to be outspoken, had strong opinions about politics and often boasted about his son, often referring to him as "my Ulysses".

Originally a Jacksonian, Jesse eventually broke with Andrew Jackson and the Democrats when developing anti-slavery leanings, and for a time wrote a number of controversial editorials in support of abolition and other issues. He became involved in local politics and was elected mayor in Georgetown and later, Bethel, both in Ohio. During the American Civil War Jesse and two business partners became involved in cotton speculation and imposed on his son, Ulysses, to use his authority to secure early access to a portion of occupied territory. The effort proved unsuccessful, and soon both Jesse and his business partners were sent north. Jesse stood next to his son while Ulysses was sworn in as president, thereafter becoming a frequent visitor to the White House. He lived out his final years in Covington, Kentucky. Much has been learned about the earlier years of Ulysses Grant from letters between father and son, as well as other source material relating to Jesse's background and business.

== Grant family ==
Jesse's paternal ancestor, Matthew Grant, and wife Priscilla and their infant daughter, embarked from Plymouth, England, aboard the Mary and John with a party of 140 emigrants who had been gathered chiefly from South West England. This Pilgrim party was one of many of the Puritan movement that fled England to escape religious persecution. After a 70-day journey the party arrived at Massachusetts Bay Colony in Nantasket, on May 30, 1630, and soon moved to and settled in Windsor, Connecticut. Matthew, referred to by the town folk as Honest Matthew Grant, was a highly trusted member of the community and became a surveyor and the town clerk. Later generations of the extended Grant family migrated westward into Pennsylvania, Ohio and Kentucky. Jesse's grandfather Noah Grant, and his brother Solomon, fought and died in the French and Indian War, and his son, (Jesse's father) also named Noah, served in the American Revolution, including the Battle of Bunker Hill, soon advancing to the rank of captain.

== Early life ==
Jesse's father, Noah D. Grant III, was married to his first wife, Anna Richardson, who became the parents of two children, Solomon and Peter Grant. Upon Noah's return from service in 1787 Anna died. On March 4, 1792, at Greensburg, Westmoreland County, Pennsylvania, Noah married his second wife, Rachael Kelly, who became Jesse's mother with the birth of her second child and first born son on January 23, 1794. Noah named Jesse after the Honorable Jesse Root, Chief Justice of the Superior Court of Connecticut. In 1799, when Jesse was age five, Noah moved his family to East Liverpool, and again in 1804, to Deerfield, both in Ohio. Noah worked in a shoe shop, earning a modest wage in Greensburg. In 1805, at age 9, Jesse's mother died, in Deerfield.

With little income and unable to provide enough for all his children, Noah Grant had the eleven year old Jesse apprenticed out to various families. Beginning in 1805, from 11 to 14 years old, Jesse worked in Ohio at undesignated farms earning his keep and making little extra money. He didn't receive a formal education in his youth and later through years of apprenticeship became self-taught in the ways of general education and business. Placing great value on the merits of education he vowed that his sons would not have to endure the same disadvantage. With no public schools in most of Ohio in the early 1800s, Jesse would later send his son Ulysses to private schools.

In 1808 Jesse's father arranged for his apprenticeship with a judge, George Tod, of Youngstown, Ohio. Jesse, age 14, lived there with his oldest sibling, Susan, while he worked under an apprenticeship that lasted four years. At the Tod residence the young Grants were treated like one of the family, where they grew to love and respect George, his wife and family. Jesse was sent to school three months a year, for two years. Among Jesse's playmates was the young David Tod, who would later become Governor of Ohio during the Civil War. Later in life Jesse often spoke of them in terms of affection and admiration. Working for the judge the uneducated Jesse soon learned to read and write and acquired an interest in politics, and later after he married, would even study grammar. A year after his commencement into apprenticeship Jesse's father Noah died, leaving him an orphan and the family very poor.

At age 16 Jesse moved to Maysville, Kentucky in 1812 to work for his half brother Peter in a tannery. Under his guidance, Jesse learned the tanning and leather goods trade. After completion of his training and honoring his commitment to Peter, he moved back to his boyhood town of Deerfield, Ohio, in 1815 and established his own tannery with little money, frugality and constant effort.

By 1814 Jesse found employment at a tannery 15 miles away in Ravenna, Ohio, owned by the wealthy Owen Brown (father of the famous John Brown who led the raid at Harpers Ferry). Owen was a cattle breeder and land speculator who operated a successful tannery in Hudson, Ohio. (Note: From 1816 to 1819 Owen was the County Commissioner in Ravenna.) Owen was a stout and outspoken abolitionist and Jesse often listened to his public orations against slavery, where he became familiar with and supportive of the cause. During this time Jesse lived under the same roof as John Brown, became friends and came to know his abolitionist philosophy. Later in life Jesse would describe John Brown as "a man of great purity of character, of high moral and physical courage, but a fanatic and extremist in whatever he advocated." In 1817 Jesse, and a John F. Wells, were offered work in a large tannery in Ravenna, now owned and managed by Mrs. Mary Mason, the widow of Jared Mason. She later married Wells and sold the tannery to Jesse who became the sole owner. Jesse sold and shipped much of his leather to a merchant in Point Pleasant, which would become his future home in 1820. During this time Jesse took up lodging at an inn across the street from the tannery. Within two years he managed to save some $1500. Jesse's father Noah Grant died in Maysville, Kentucky, on February 14, 1819. That year, at age 25, Jesse became ill and was sent to Kentucky to recover from malaria, while his affliction sickness lasted more than a year. Unable to work and with creditors pressing he lost most of his savings. In 1820, when he was partially recovered and able to travel short distances, he moved to Maysville and lived with relatives for several weeks. After recovering he returned to Ohio and the tannery business.

== Family and community life ==
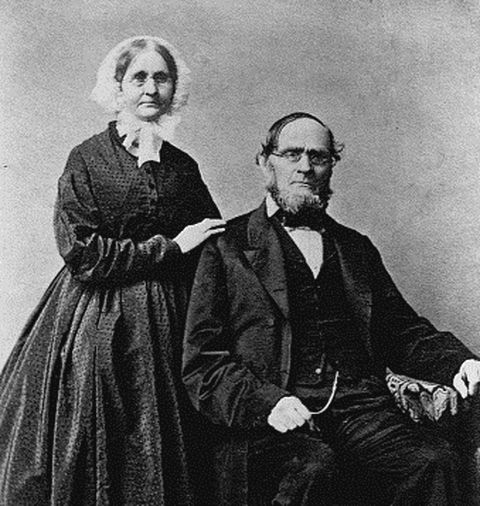
Jesse and Hannah Grant

Jesse Grant's greater family was large, residing in both Ohio and in the slave state of Kentucky. In 1820, he found work for a brief period at a tannery in Bethel, Ohio. Later that year, as an experienced tanner, he moved to Point Pleasant on the Ohio River and gained the position of foreman in a new tannery owned by Thomas Page. He soon met his future wife, Hannah Simpson, whose grandfather had arrived at Philadelphia in 1762. On June 24, 1821, at age 27, Jesse Grant married Hannah Simpson and settled in Point Pleasant. Their marriage brought six children. Their son Ulysses was the oldest, and born April 27, 1822, as Hiram Ulysses Grant. A second son, Samuel Simpson, (Note: He was referred to as Simpson by family and friends.) was born September 23, 1825, and later became a successful merchant in Galena. Their first daughter, Clara Rachel, was born December 11, 1828, followed by a second daughter, Virginia Paine, born February 20, 1832. Their third son, Orvil Lynch, was born May 15, 1835. Their third daughter and youngest child was Mary Frances, born July 30, 1839. By October 1823, Jesse had managed to save about $1100 (~$36,851 in 2025) to start his own tannery in Georgetown and moved the family there to start his new business. Upon arrival to Georgetown Jesse contacted the county Justice of the Peace, Thomas L. Hamer, on August 12, 1823, paid $50 and secured the deed to a lot not far from Georgetown Square. Here he built a two-story brick house where Ulysses, still an only child, and future brothers and sisters would be raised for the next sixteen years. On the same street he set up his tannery, a half block south from his house. Jesse also cultivated 30 acres of land while managing 50 acres of forest. With a successful business Jesse was able to pay off the deed within one year. When his second son, Samuel Simpson, was born Jesse built one of several additions to the home, eventually doubling the size of the house.

=== Father ===
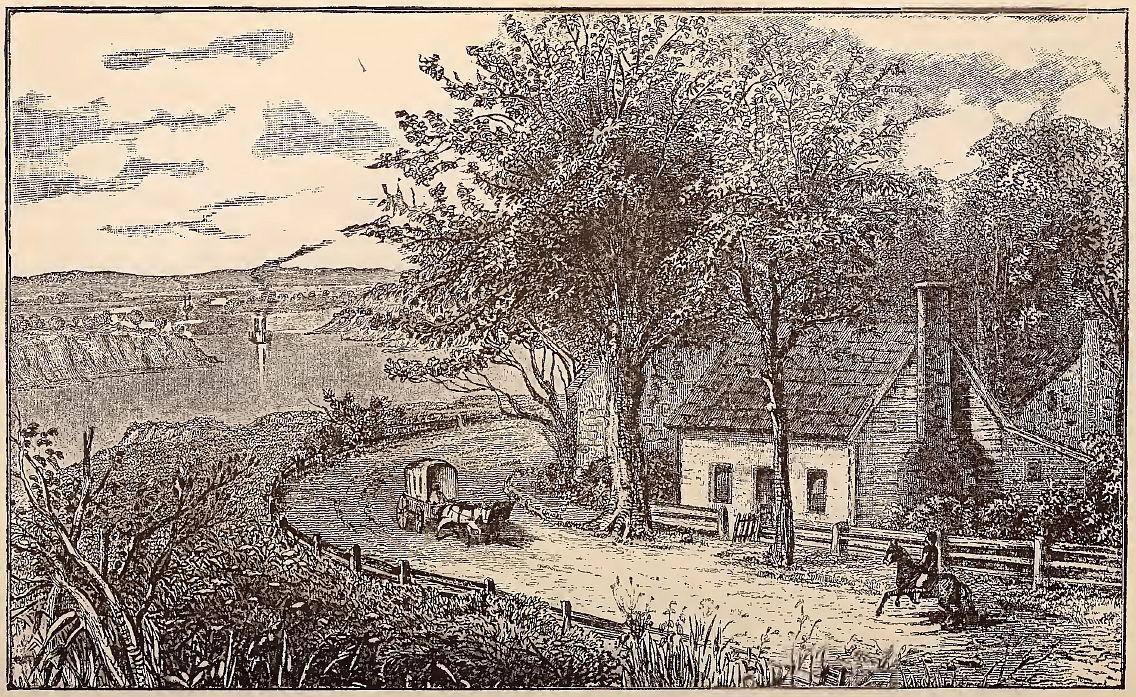
Historical depiction Grant's home, Point Pleasant, birthplace of Ulysses S. Grant

Less than a year after Jesse and Hannah were married they became the parents of their first son Ulysses, who was met with much expectation and family fanfare. Family tradition as the Grant family observed it held that the naming of a first born son was a significant undertaking and something that was given much consideration. Members among the immediate Grant and Simpson families were all hoping for their own personal favorite names for the infant son. Subsequently, several weeks after the child's birth Jesse and Hannah still had not settled on a name. After mounting inquiries from friends and neighbors about the name for the boy, members of the Grant and Simpson family finally gathered at the Simpson family home to decide on a name. The prospective names were placed in a hat, a process which Hannah expressed reservation for, deeming it uncivilized. However, faced with the prospect of returning home without a name for the baby she finally consented. Jesse and Grandmother Simpson cast ballots for Ulysses, which was taken from a novel in François Fénelon's novel, Telemachus, lent to her by Jesse, and poem. Grandfather Simpson, out of respect for an honored ancestor, also cast a ballot for "Hiram". Six ballots in all were cast, where the name "Ulysses", was drawn by Hannah's youngest sister, Anne. Wanting also to honor the Simpson family, Jesse at this time declared that his son's name would be "Hiram Ulysses Grant", which the infant was Christened with and became his formal and legal name. Jesse, however, always referred to his son as "Ulysses", often referring to him as "my Ulysses". It is generally accepted among historians that Hannah and Jesse loved and took much pride in their children and their accomplishments.

Jesse placed his eldest son, 'Hiram Ulysses', in a local one room school house in Georgetown. Later he would send Ulysses to boarding school across the river in Maysville, Kentucky, and to another in Ripley, Ohio, but to Jesse's disappointment these prospects never materialized into anything that justified his investment.

At an early age Jesse prevailed on his son to work at his tannery, but it was not long before Ulysses expressed a strong dislike for the practice. Not wanting to force his son into such labor Jesse instead gave the young Ulysses other responsibilities, driving and transporting wagon loads of bark, supplies and goods to and from the tannery. As Ulysses showed a great ability to ride and manage horses, Jesse put this talent to use and one day offered Ulysses the job of driving a wagon and team of horses, 40 miles away to Cincinnati, picking up passengers and returning home. Before long he would often send his son on other business related journeys, transporting goods and people, on a regular basis.

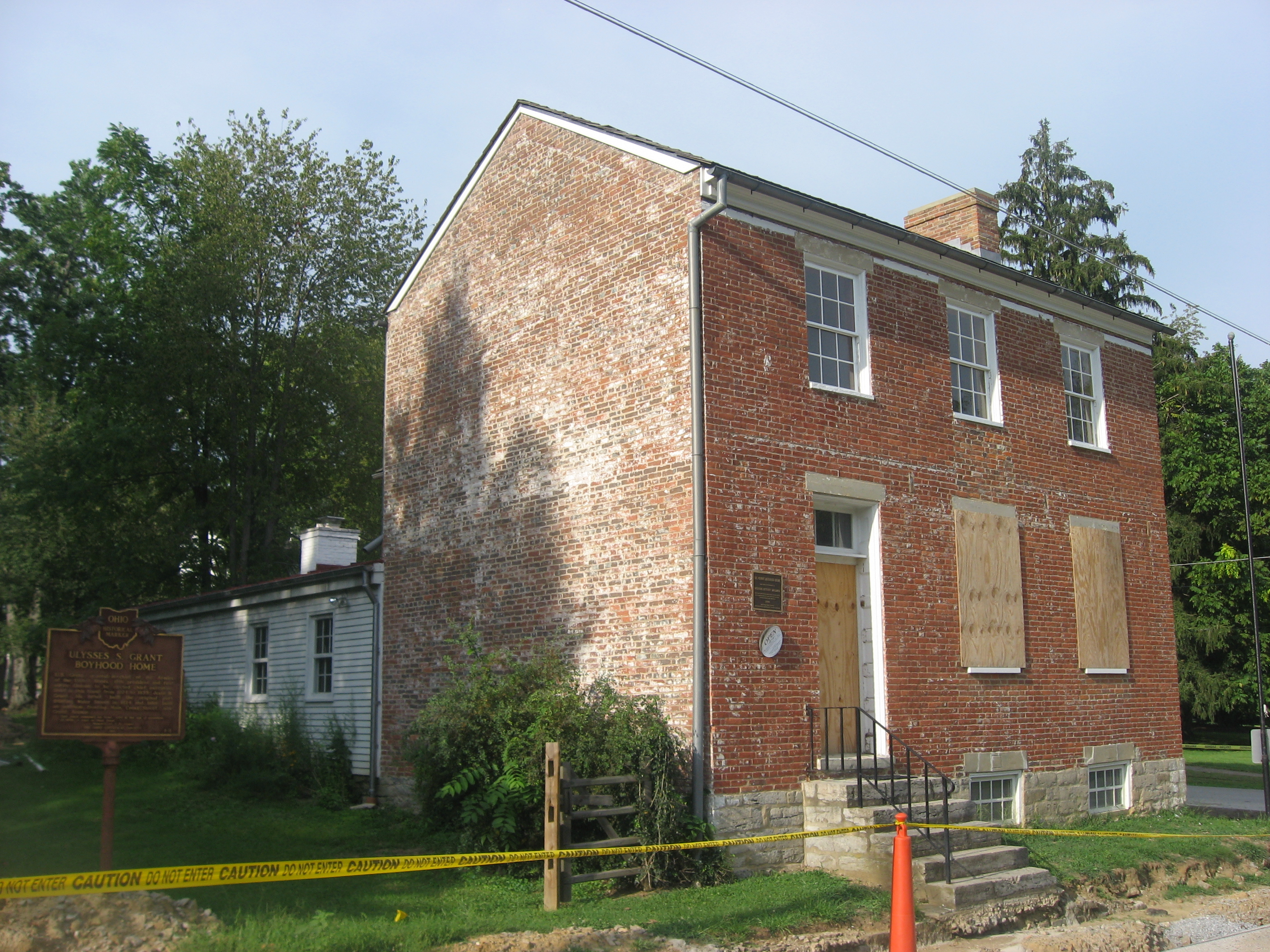
Grant household in Georgetown

Jesse became very proud of his eldest son and his ability as he came of age, often telling stories about and referring to him as "my Ulysses". As the independent minded Ulysses became of age, however, their paternal relationship would be put through various trials. In 1838 Jesse enrolled Ulysses in abolitionist John Rankin's academy during the winter period. (Note: For years Rankin had been using his home on the Ohio River, part of the greater Underground Railroad, to aid runaway slaves crossing over from Kentucky.) Always striving to secure good education for his sons, Jesse made arrangements for Ulysses to be nominated and enrolled in the U.S. military academy at West Point without Ulysses' knowledge. Through his political associations Jesse was referred to a former friend, Thomas L. Hamer, who was also a prominent lawyer and was being considered by the Democratic Party as a possible candidate for the Presidency, asking him to nominate Ulysses. However, because of Jesse's past indifference with Hamer over Jacksonian politics, he attempted to bypass him and instead wrote to Thomas Morris, senator from Ohio, asking that he nominate Ulysses. Morris wrote back on February 19, 1839, explaining that Hamer was the only one authorized to submit a nomination from Brown County Here Jesse found himself in an awkward position, as a few years earlier he had criticized Hamer in the Castigator over a disagreement involving Andrew Jackson, use of public funds and a U.S. bank. To Jesse's surprise, Hamer honored his request and gave the nomination to Ulysses, asking "why didn't you apply to me sooner?", and in so doing, restored their friendship. When Hamer submitted the nomination he incorrectly entered the name "Ulysses S. Grant", which became the formal name and would stay with Ulysses throughout his adult life.

Ulysses had no particular inclination to military life at that time and at first declined to go, expressing little appreciation for the efforts of his father and friends. After a brief discussion, however, Jesse was able to convince Ulysses to enroll in the academy. As Ulysses was eager to set out into a world he had seen little of, he now saw the prospect as an opportunity to do so with the hopes of becoming successful on his own. Upon word of his acceptance to West Point, Ulysses departed for New York on May 15, 1839. In 1847 Jesse sold his Georgetown home to Marshall Jenning for $2600 (~$76,043 in 2025).

When Ulysses was stationed on the West coast of California at Fort Humboldt in 1854 he had at that point been away from his wife and family two years. Longing to return home, and also prompted by rumors of excessive drinking, Ulysses tendered his resignation. Shocked by the news, Jesse intervened, feeling Ulysses was making a terrible mistake, and urged Congressmen Andrew Ellison, and old friend of Jesse's, to get the War Department to order Grant home on recruitment duty instead, or otherwise grant him a six-month leave. Ellison presented the request to Secretary of War Jefferson Davis, but the request was denied. This would prove to be one more example of Jesse's involvement with his son's affairs.

=== Church ===
Jesse regarded education and church as of equal importance. Along with his wife Hannah, they embraced the Methodist doctrine of sanctification, and living a holy and upright life and taught their children to observe the Sabbath day. They refrained from playing cards, or dancing, and would not permit their children to dance, or swear. With no Methodist church on the Ohio frontier, they had both helped to found a Methodist church in Georgetown which began holding services in 1827. Jesse became a "ruling spirit in church affairs", a leading member of the congregation and served the church as a trustee and steward. Methodism in America was growing rapidly as various Methodist clergymen traveled about in a "circuit", establishing churches along the way. Jesse would make his home available to any such minister that came to town.

=== Politics ===
When Grant was not working at the tannery he spent time writing, was sometimes known to be unreserved and outspoken with his opinions on slavery and abolition and became politically active in Georgetown. In 1830 Jesse became a Master in the Masonic Lodge and lent much of his time to writing about politics and social issues for an abolitionist newspaper called The Castigator, a weekly newspaper in Ripley. Its editor was David Ammen, a close associate of abolitionist John Rankin who also resided in Ripley. Through their associations Ammen's son became a playmate of Grant's son Ulysses. In 1837 he wrote a number of controversial editorials in The Castigator's successor newspaper, in Georgetown, The Castigator and democratic expositor. Originally he was a Democrat politically, and he considered himself a Jacksonian Democrat. Grant ran unsuccessfully for Georgetown mayor in 1830 and for the state legislature in 1832. He wrote in The Castigator defending Jackson's veto of a recharter bill for the Second Bank of the United States, declaring that "only those with the hateful taint of aristocracy" opposed the veto. However, in the 1832 elections later that year, Grant switched his position on the Bank to supporting recharter. The change in his political views ruined his friendship with powerful Jacksonian Thomas L. Hamer, who said that Grant cared "not who sinks so long as he swims...He is alike faithfless in his political principles, and his personal attachments." Grant abandoned the Democrats and became a Whig. He supported the American System of Henry Clay, which called for a central bank, protective tariff, and internal improvements.

Grant was elected as the Whig mayor of Georgetown, Ohio, serving from 1837 to 1839. Just before and during the Civil War he was a supporter of President Abraham Lincoln, politically active and outspoken against slavery and secession, and wrote a series of controversial editorials on these issues in prominent Northern newspapers. (Note: See Civil War era section for details.)

=== Bethel ===
In 1841 Jesse returned to Bethel and purchased a house owned by former Ohio Senator Thomas Morris and soon opened his own tannery nearby on the same street. That same year Ulysses came to visit on a summer furlough from West Point after being there two years. Knowing Ulysses' great love of horses, Jesse gave him an unbroken horse to train and ride during his stay.

After a ten-year residency in Bethel, Jesse was elected that town's first mayor, in 1851. After serving a four-year term Jesse moved to Covington, Kentucky, and opened another leather store on Madison Avenue.

On August 22, 1848, Jesse's son Ulysses married Julia Dent at her parents townhouse in St. Louis, but Jesse, an ardent and outspoken abolitionist, did not attend their wedding. This was not because he was not fond of Julia, but because her father Fredrick Dent owned slaves. Present at the wedding was Fredrick's friend and future Confederate General, James Longstreet, who was a cousin to the bride, Julia, and best man at the wedding. At the end of the month, Ulysses and Julia traveled to Bethel where Julia met the greater Grant and Simpson families, who along with Jesse and Hannah, welcomed Julia into the family.

In August 1853 Jesse's son Ulysses was assigned to duty on the west coast at Fort Humboldt, but ran into difficulty with his commanding officer at the remote fort when rumors began to circulate about Ulysses' alleged excessive drinking. After being given the choice to resign or face court martial Ulysses resigned and returned home to his wife and children much to the disappointed of his father, who upon his arrival expressed his feelings with the comment, "West Point spoiled one of my boys for business", where Ulysses replied "I guess that's about so". Jesse made attempts to avert his son's resignation and wrote to Jefferson Davis of the War Department, but his appeal for his son's reinstatement was turned down.

=== Galena ===
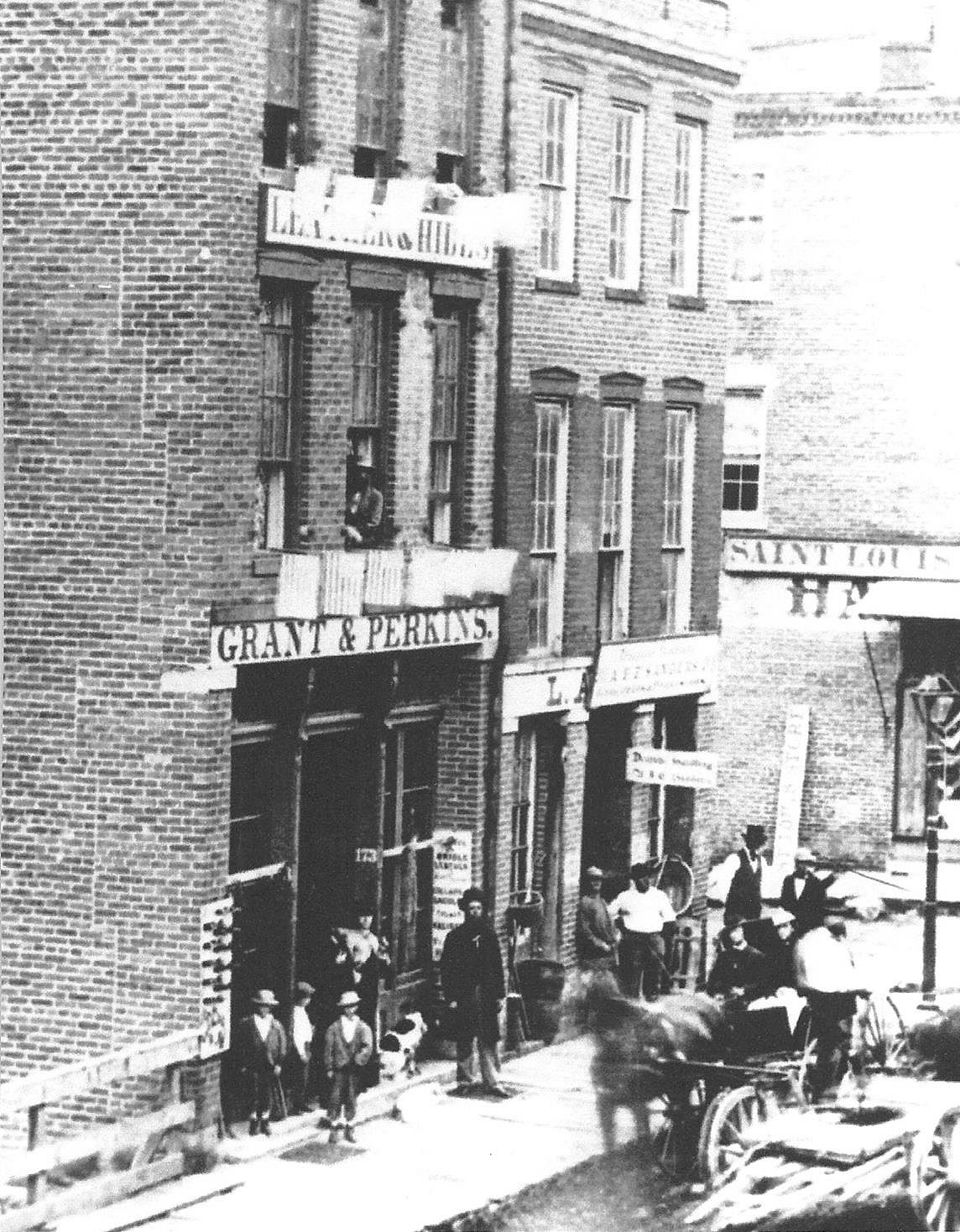
Grant & Perkins, leather store, Galena, Illinois, 1862

Later Jesse formed a partnership with E. A. Collins and opened another leather goods store, on Main Street, in Galena, Illinois, with the hope of establishing his three sons in the business so he could retire. The store was housed in a handsome four story brick building on the curving Main Street, whose store front was garnished with displays of fancy saddles and boots. The store sold harnesses, saddles and other leather goods, while it bought hides from the local farmers. Jesse withdrew from the business almost entirely while the store was operated by his sons Simpson (Samuel) and Orvil. By 1860 he had bought out his partner and assumed full ownership of the entire operation. Jesse, now sixty, withdrew from the business and passed control of the enterprise over to his three sons, Simpson, Orvil, and soon, Ulysses. After resigning from the Army and failing at farming and several business ventures, Ulysses Grant turned to his father for help and accepted a job clerking at the Galena store, arriving there in April. He functioned doing routine work and tended the companies books. During the winter months he would travel to neighboring states to purchase green hides from local farmers.

In the days preceding the war and after the attack on Fort Sumter, Jesse's leather store became a hotbed of Republican discussion and agitation. Jesse and his sons Simpson and Orvil, were all staunch Republicans, while Ulysses had Democratic leanings and originally favored Douglas over Lincoln. The looming war would soon diminish such differences for all. Various speakers, including Jesse's lawyer, John Aaron Rawlins, (Note: Rawlins would later become Secretary of War when Grant became President.) engaged in a number of passionate public discussions over secession and other politics. Ulysses Grant was still working at the store when on April 15, the day after the battle, news of the attack on Fort Sumter reached Galena, where he promptly re-enlisted into the Army, answering President Lincoln's call for seventy five thousand volunteers.

Among the things being discussed at the meetings was the pressing issue of recruitment. A West Point graduate, Ulysses was the only man in town with professional military training, and was elected to preside over the meeting. When Ulysses was given command of the 21st Illinois Volunteer Infantry Regiment, a regiment composed of unruly volunteers, Jesse expressed disappointment in a letter to him, feeling that Ulysses' talent and efforts would have been better used commanding regular army troops. In a reply letter to his father Ulysses attempted to abate Jesse's criticism maintaining, "You ask if I should not like to go in the regular army. I should not. I want to bring my children (recruits) up to useful employment, and in the army the chance is poor", stressing the point that he was more concerned about the war than he was a career.

== Civil War era ==
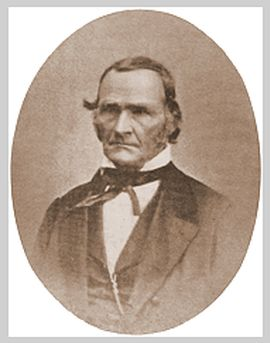
Jesse Grant in 1863, age 69

During the American Civil War Jesse resided in Covington, Kentucky, which remained neutral during that war. Jesse's son Simpson died of tuberculosis in September, 1861. His son Ulysses brought his children to stay with him believing they would be safer there.

Jesse followed the continuing successes of Ulysses as he advanced in rank and assumed command of major campaigns. When controversial stories appeared in newspapers about the heavy casualties suffered under Generals Prentiss and McClernand at the Battle of Shiloh under the command of Ulysses S. Grant, Jesse defended his son and responded with numerous editorials in rebuttal in various Cincinnati newspapers in such a manner as to suggest he was speaking for his son the General. Jesse also wrote a heated letter to Governor Tod of Ohio, blaming "five thousand cowards" who threw down their arms and fled, for the high casualties that occurred at the battle. Jesse's letters became so frequent that General Grant, who had much distrust for newspapers and their coverage of the war, had to step in and forbid him from writing to the newspapers. In a letter to his father, Ulysses wrote, "my worst enemy could do me no more injury than you are doing".

As the war caused the price of cotton to escalate it invited many speculators, moving about in the midst of a major and prolonged military campaign against Vicksburg, causing many problems for the Union Army. At this time Jesse became involved in cotton speculation and arrived with his two partners, the Mack Brothers from Cincinnati, who had encouraged him to use his son's (General Grant) influence to obtain permits to purchase cotton in a war district. Traveling from Ohio they arrived unexpectedly at General Grant's headquarters in northern Mississippi while he was busy with commanding a major campaign. Grant had already received reports from Sherman and others of Jewish merchants who were "highly visible" among the trading which was occurring by both northern and southern interests, often without permits.

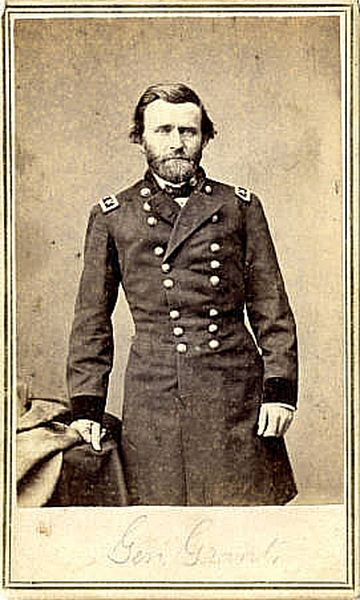
General Ulysses S. Grant

By the time Jesse and his two Jewish partners arrived with a request for permits to operate, they were immediately rebuffed by an angered General Grant for presuming on the Army and his patience. The incident had been indicative of the problem with cotton speculators in general who often collaborated with Union Officers, much to the frustration of General Grant. Various modern historians believe that Jesse's arrival with two prominent Jewish cotton speculators from Cincinnati is largely what led Grant in 1862 to issue General Order 11 expelling all Jews from his district. Jesse and his partners were instructed to leave the district on the next train going north. The incident proved to be an embarrassment for Grant which once again placed his father and himself on opposing sides of a serious issue. Later, in a letter to Congressman Washburne, Jesse defended his son's action, claiming the Order was "issued by express instructions from Washington".

After the war, on February 6, 1866, President Andrew Johnson nominated Jesse for Postmaster in Covington, Kentucky, having the charge of a first class post office in a city numbering approximately thirty thousand residents. As President Ulysses Grant nominated him for another term on February 9, 1870, to continue after his first term had expired. The nomination was confirmed on March 2.

Jesse's business ventures proved to be very successful and he was now worth more than $100,000. He intended to give his children the greater part of his estate, however Ulysses didn't want any of it, feeling he had done nothing to deserve it. Instead Jesse gave $1000 to each of Ulysses' children for their education, with the remainder of his estate going to his other sons and daughters.

== Father of a president ==
When Ulysses S. Grant was sworn in as President, Jesse was standing nearby, as Chief Justice Salmon Chase administered the Oath of Office, March 4, 1869. Jesse had arrived without his wife Hannah, who disliked publicity and never came to the White House. Asked by reporters where his wife was, Jesse spoke briefly, informing all that she had been invited but declined. Before the inauguration Jesse had inquired about lodging for himself and family, where Ulysses informed him that his extra rooms had been promised to friends. Some historians suggest that Ulysses at this time was on uneasy terms with his father and made no further effort to secure lodging for Jesse and family.

In the few remaining years of Jesse's life he was a frequent visitor to his son the president at the White House. He was always eager to comment to reporters about his son's activities and the business of the day. Jesse died June 29, 1873, in Covington, Kentucky, shortly after President Grant began his second term. His funeral was held at the Union Methodist Episcopal Church in Covington. Jesse was buried at Spring Grove Cemetery, in Cincinnati, Ohio. His wife, Hannah, died ten years later in 1883, in Jersey City, New Jersey, just two years before their son Ulysses died.

== See also ==
- Bibliography of Ulysses S. Grant
- Bibliography of the American Civil War

== Bibliography ==
Publications

- Ash, Stephen V. (2010). "Chapter 15: Civil War Exodus: The Jews and Grant's General Order No. 11". In Sarna, Jonathan D.; Mendelsohn, Adam D. (eds.). Jews and the Civil War: A Reader. New York: New York University Press. pp. 363–384. ISBN 9780814708590.
- Brands, H. W. (2012). The Man Who Saved The Union Ulysses S. Grant in War and Peace. New York: Doubleday. ISBN 9780385532426.
- Chernow, Ron (2017). Grant. New York: Penguin Press. ISBN 978-1-5942-0487-6.
- Broadwater, Robert P. (2012). Ulysses S. Grant: A Biography. ABC-CLIO. ISBN 978-0-3133-9255-9.
- Cramer, Jesse Grant; Grant, Ulysses S. (1912). Letters of Ulysses S. Grant to his father and his youngest sister, 1857-78. J.P. Putnam and Sons, New York. ISBN 9781623768607.
- Cross, Nelson (1872). The Modern Ulysses, LL. D.: His Political Record. J. S. Redfield.
- Headley, Joel Tyler (1872). The Life of Ulysses S. Grant. K. B. Treat Publishing, New York.
- King, Charles (1914). The true Ulysses S. Grant. J. B. Lippincott Company.
- Marshall, Edward Chauncey (1869). The ancestry of General Grant, and their contemporaries. Sheldon & Company, New York.
- McFeely, William S. (1981). Grant: A Biography. W.W. Norton. ISBN 0-393-01372-3.
- McPherson, James M. (1988). Battle Cry of Freedom: The Civil War Era. New York: Oxford University Press. ISBN 0-19-503863-0.
- Miers, Earl S. (1984). The Web of Victory: Grant at Vicksburg. LSU Press. ISBN 9780807111994.
- Richardson, Albert Deane (1868). A personal history of Ulysses S. Grant. American publishing company, Hartford, Conn.
- Simon, John Y.; Grant, Ulysses S. (1994). The Papers of Ulysses S. Grant: November 1, 1869-October 31, 1870. Southern Illinois University Press / Ulysses S. Grant Association. ISBN 9780809319657.
- Simpson, Brooks D. (2014) [2000]. Ulysses S. Grant, Triumph over Adversity, 1822-1865. Boston, Massachusetts: Houghton Mifflin. ISBN 978-0-395-65994-6.
- Smith, Jean Edward (2001). Grant. New York: Simon & Schuster. ISBN 0-684-84927-5.
- Spencer, Thomas E. (1998). Where They're Buried: A Directory Containing More Than Twenty Thousand Names of Notable Persons Buried in American Cemeteries. Genealogical Publishing Com. ISBN 978-0-8063-4823-0.
- Stoddard, William Osborn (1886). Ulysses S. Grant. White, Stokes, & Allen, New York.
- Thayer, William M. (1885). From Tannery to the White House: The Life of Ulysses S. Grant : His Boyhood, Youth, Manhood, Public and Private Life and Services. James H. Earle, Boston.
- White, Ronald C. (2016). American Ulysses: A Life of Ulysses S. Grant. Random House Publishing Group. ISBN 978-1-5883-6992-5.

Internet sources

- "Jesse Grant (1794–1873), Essay and Timeline". USGrant.com. 2017. Archived from the original on April 4, 2016 – via Wayback Machine.
  Sources for essay : Richardson, 1868; McFeely, 2002; Marshall, 1869; The Biographical Encyclopedia of Ohio of the Nineteenth-Century Cincinnati, 1876.
- "About The Castigator. Ripley, Ohio; 1824–1833". Library of Congress.
- King, Gilbert (2012). "The Civil War - General Grant in Love and War". Smithsonian Institution.

Further reading

- Richardson, Albert Deane (1868). A Personal History of Ulysses S. Grant. American Publishing Company, Hartford, Conn.
- Reeves, John (2023). Soldier of Destiny: Slavery, Secession, and the Redemption of Ulysses S. Grant. New York: Pegasus Books.
