= Matthew Grant =

English-born Connecticut surveyor and carpenter (1601–1681)

- Born: October 27, 1601; Exeter, Devon, England
- Died: December 16, 1681 (aged 80); Windsor, Connecticut, English America
- Occupations: Surveyor; carpenter; clerk; farmer
- Spouse: Priscilla Grey (m. 1625)
- Children: 14
- Relatives: Jesse Root Grant (4th great-grandson); Ulysses S. Grant (5th great-grandson)

Matthew Grant (October 27, 1601 – December 16, 1681) was an English-born Connecticut surveyor, carpenter, clerk, and farmer who was the patriarch of the Grant family. He was the 4th paternal great-grandfather of Jesse Root Grant, a farmer and successful merchant, and the 5th paternal great-grandfather of Ulysses S. Grant, the 18th U.S. president.

== Biography ==
Matthew Grant was born in Exeter, Devon, England, on October 27, 1601. He was the son of John Grant (1573–1640) and Alice Turberville (1577–1640). John was an Anglican vicar in Roxby, Yorkshire, and Alice was the daughter of an English Lord in Woodbridge, Dorset. On November 16, 1625, Matthew married Priscilla Grey (1601–1644).

On March 30, 1630, Matthew alongside Priscilla, their daughter Priscilla, and his mother Alice immigrated to Boston Harbor aboard the Mary and John. From there, they traveled to Connecticut and Matthew became a carpenter in Dorchester and a worked as a surveyor in the Windsor area. He also worked as the town's first clerk and maintained the local church's records. He also maintained a farm on the outskirts of the town. Priscilla died in 1644 and Matthew died in 1681 at his farm.
