= Thomas L. Hamer =

American politician (1800–1846)

Thomas Lyon Hamer
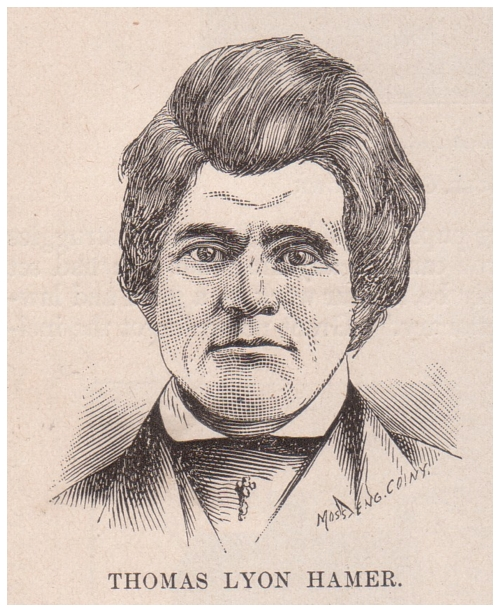

Member of the U.S. House of Representatives from Ohio's 5th district
- In office March 4, 1833 – March 3, 1839
- Preceded by: William Russell
- Succeeded by: William Doan

Member of the Ohio House of Representatives from the Brown County district
- In office December 5, 1825 – December 3, 1826
- Preceded by: George Edwards; John Cochran
- Succeeded by: John Cochran
- In office December 1, 1828 – December 5, 1830 Serving with John Cochran
- Preceded by: John Cochran; George Edwards
- Succeeded by: John Cochran; Nathan Ellis

Personal details
- Born: July 1800 Northumberland County, Pennsylvania, U.S.
- Died: December 2, 1846 (aged 46) Monterrey, Nuevo León, Mexico
- Resting place: Georgetown, Ohio
- Party: Jacksonian Democrat
- Spouse: Lydia Bruce Higgins (1822–1845, her death)
- Profession: Lawyer, soldier

Thomas Lyon Hamer (July 1800 – December 2, 1846) was a Democratic congressman and soldier in the United States.

Hamer was born in July 1800 in Northumberland County, Pennsylvania. He was a school teacher before being admitted to the bar in 1821. He was an Ohio Presidential elector in 1828 for Andrew Jackson.

He practiced law in Georgetown, Ohio and was elected to the Ohio House of Representatives in 1828, which body unanimously chose him as their Speaker in December 1829. As Speaker, he sought to maintain independence from party politics; although Jackson's supporters controlled a slight advantage over John Quincy Adams' supporters, he appointed Adams men as a majority in seven of the fifteen standing committees. When the Jackson caucus proposed enforcing party discipline during judicial elections, Hamer fought the proposal fiercely; envisioning a choice between the party candidate and the candidate he believed best qualified, he denounced a vote for the party candidate as perjury of his oath of office. These statements won him criticism from party stalwarts who deemed him unfaithful to the interests of his party.

Following service in the House, Hamer was elected to the U.S. Congress. While serving as a congressman he nominated Hiram Ulysses Grant, the son of Jesse Root Grant, a constituent (the friend of his father-in-law), to be a cadet at West Point. Hamer incorrectly put on the nomination the name "Ulysses S. Grant" (assuming his middle name was his mother's maiden name of Simpson, the custom of the time) and the name stayed with the new cadet.

When the Mexican–American War broke out Hamer volunteered as a private in the Ohio Volunteers, and was quickly commissioned as a major in June 1846. Popular and well respected, Hamer was appointed a brigadier general of volunteers on July 1, 1846. He was placed in command of the 1st Brigade of William O. Butler's Volunteer Division of the Army of Occupation. He led his brigade with distinction into the fighting at the battle of Monterrey. When General Butler fell wounded, Hamer assumed command of the division. When Mexican General Pedro de Ampudia requested to discuss surrender terms, it was Hamer who delivered the message to General Taylor. While still serving in the army he was elected to another term in Congress but died unexpectedly while stationed with the army at Monterrey on December 2, 1846. Upon Hamer's death, General Zachary Taylor exclaimed "I have lost the balance wheel of my volunteer army" and Lt. Ulysses S. Grant also lamented that the "U.S. has lost a future president." Grant later described him as "one of the ablest men Ohio ever produced."

He was buried in his hometown of Georgetown, a few miles from his namesake village of Hamersville. Also named in his honor is Hamer Township in neighboring Highland County, Ohio.

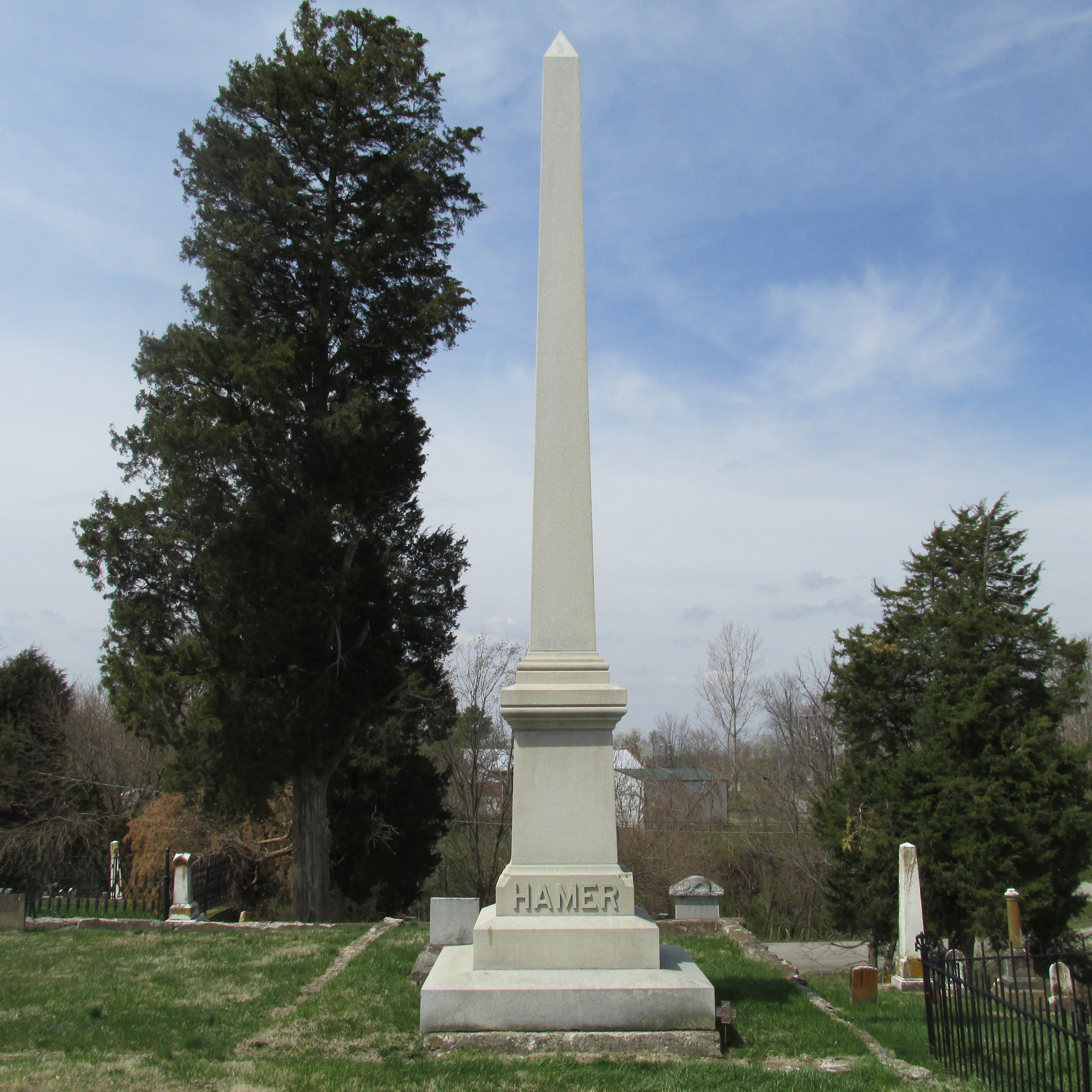
Headstone of Thomas L. Hamer located in Georgetown, Ohio.

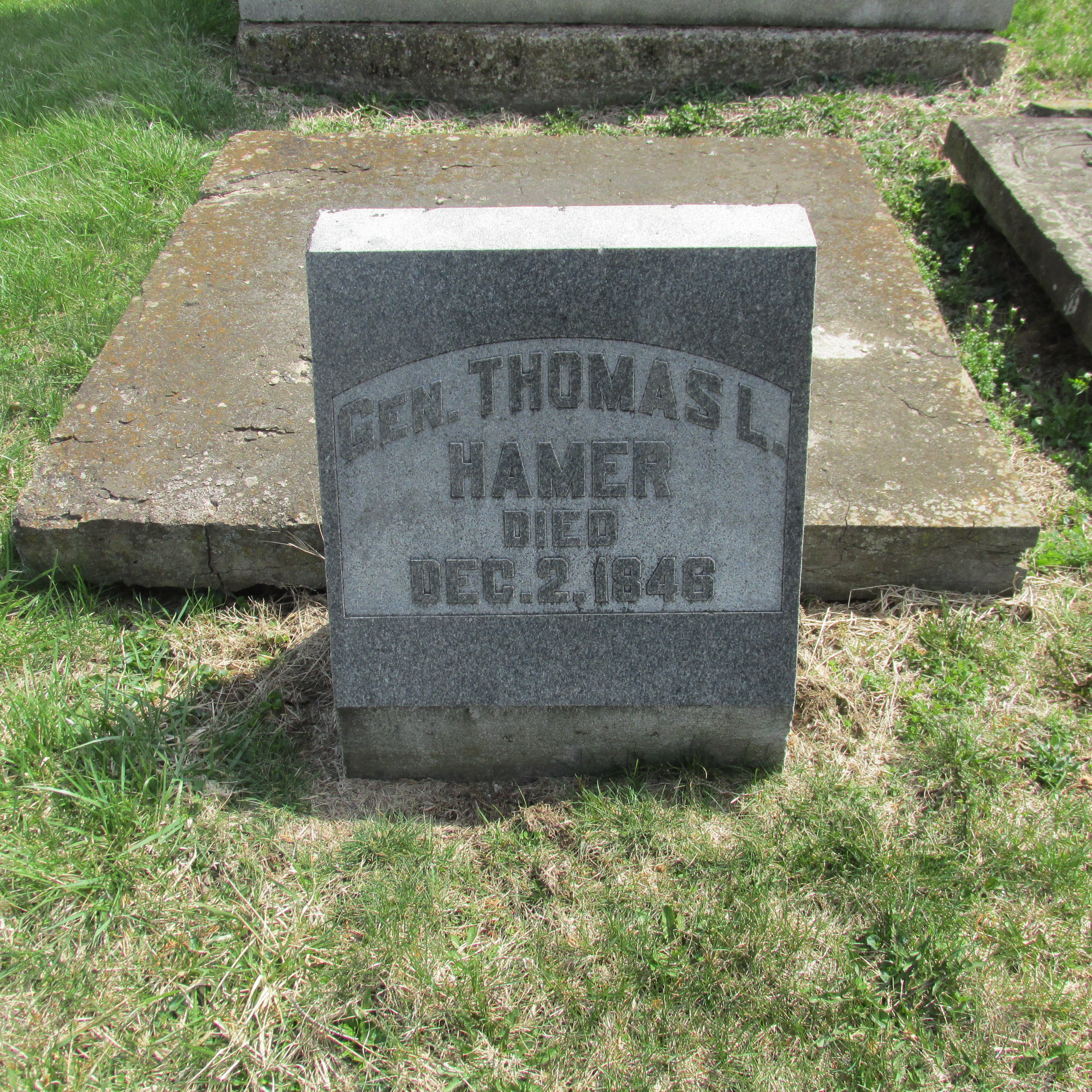
Grave marker of Thomas L. Hamer.

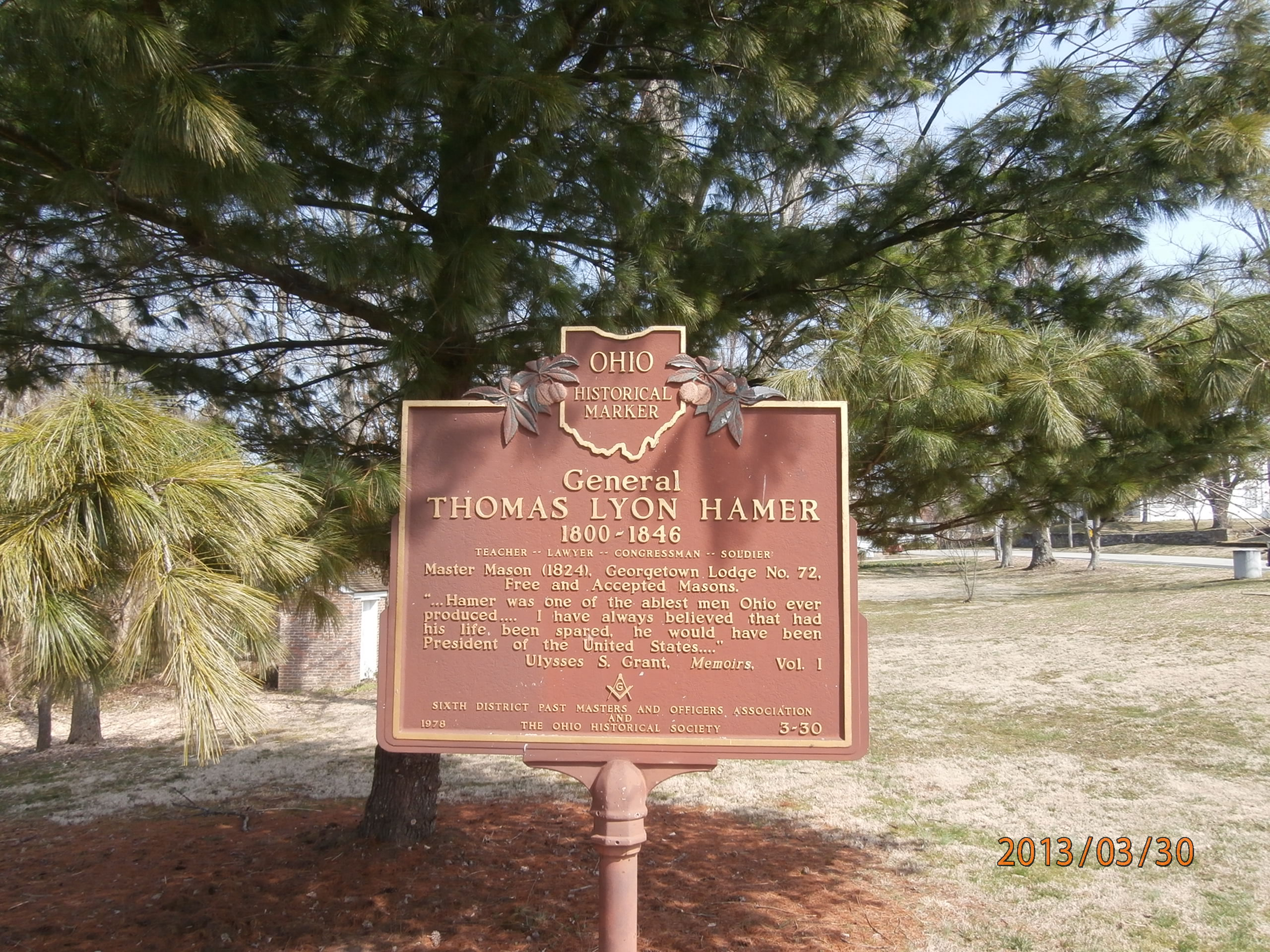
Thomas L. Hamer Historical Marker next to U.S. Grant Boyhood Home

U.S. House of Representatives
Preceded by William Russell	Member of the U.S. House of Representatives from Ohio's 5th congressional district 1833–1839	Succeeded by William Doan
