= Jean Edward Smith =

American biographer and academic (1932–2019)

- Born: October 13, 1932; Washington, D.C., U.S.
- Died: September 1, 2019 (aged 86); Huntington, West Virginia, U.S.
- Education: Princeton University (AB); Columbia University (PhD)
- Occupations: Biographer, academic

Jean Edward Smith (October 13, 1932 – September 1, 2019) was an American biographer and the John Marshall Professor of Political Science at Marshall University. He was also professor emeritus at the University of Toronto after having served as professor of political economy there for thirty-five years. Smith was also on the faculty of the Master of American History and Government program at Ashland University.

The winner of the 2008 Francis Parkman Prize and the 2002 finalist for the Pulitzer Prize for Biography or Autobiography, Smith was called "today’s foremost biographer of formidable figures in American history."

== Education and military service ==
A graduate of McKinley High School in Washington, D.C., Smith received an A.B. from Princeton University in 1954. While attending Princeton, Smith was mentored under law professor and political scientist William M. Beaney. Serving in the U.S. military from 1954 to 1961, he rose to the rank of Captain. Smith served in West Berlin and Dachau, Germany. In 1964, he obtained a Ph.D. from the Department of Public Law and Government of Columbia University.

== Career ==
Smith began his teaching career as assistant professor of government at Dartmouth College, a post he held from 1963 until 1965. He then became a professor of political economy at the University of Toronto in 1965 until his retirement in 1999. Smith also served as visiting professor at several universities during his tenure at the University of Toronto and after his retirement including the Freie Universität in Berlin, Georgetown University, the University of Virginia’s Woodrow Wilson Department of Government and Foreign Affairs, the University of California at San Diego, and Marshall University in Huntington, West Virginia. He died on September 1, 2019, from complications of Parkinson's disease with his family by his side.

== Bibliography ==
Smith won the 2008 Francis Parkman Prize for FDR, his 2007 biography. He was the 2002 finalist for the Pulitzer Prize for Biography or Autobiography for Grant, his 2001 biography.

- The Defense of Berlin. Baltimore: Johns Hopkins University Press, 1963. (LCCN 63-17670)
- The Wall as Watershed. Arlington, Virginia: Institute for Defense Analyses, 1966.
- Germany Beyond the Wall: People, Politics, and Prosperity. Boston: Little, Brown, 1969.
- The Papers of Lucius D. Clay: Germany, 1945-1949. (ed.) Bloomington, Ind.: Indiana University Press, 1974.
- The Evolution of NATO with Four Plausible Threat Scenarios. (with Steven L. Canby), Ottawa, Canada: Canada Department of National Defence, 1987.
- The Conduct of American Foreign Policy Debated. (with Herbert Levine) New York: McGraw-Hill, 1990.
- Civil Rights and Civil Liberties Debated. (with Herbert Levine) 1988. (ISBN 013134966X)
- The Constitution and American Foreign Policy.
- Lucius D. Clay: An American Life. New York: Henry Holt and Company, 1990. (ISBN 080500999X)
- George Bush's War. New York: Henry Holt and Company, 1992. (ISBN 0805013881)
- John Marshall: Definer of a Nation. New York: Henry, Holt & Company, 1996. (ISBN 080501389X)
- The Face of Justice: Portraits of John Marshall. (with William H. Gerdts, Wendell D. Garrett, Frederick S. Voss, and David B. Dearinger), Huntington, West Virginia: Huntington Museum of Art, 2001. (ISBN 0965388816)
- Grant. New York: Simon and Schuster, 2001. (ISBN 0684849267)
- FDR. New York: Random House, 2007. (ISBN 9781400061211)
- Eisenhower in War and Peace. New York: Random House, 2012. (ISBN 9781400066933)
- Bush. New York: Simon & Schuster, 2016. (ISBN 9781476741192)
- The Liberation of Paris: How Eisenhower, de Gaulle, and von Choltitz Saved the City of Light. New York: Simon and Schuster, 2019. (ISBN 9781501164927)
