= Ronald C. White =

American historian (born 1939)

Ronald Cedric White, Jr.
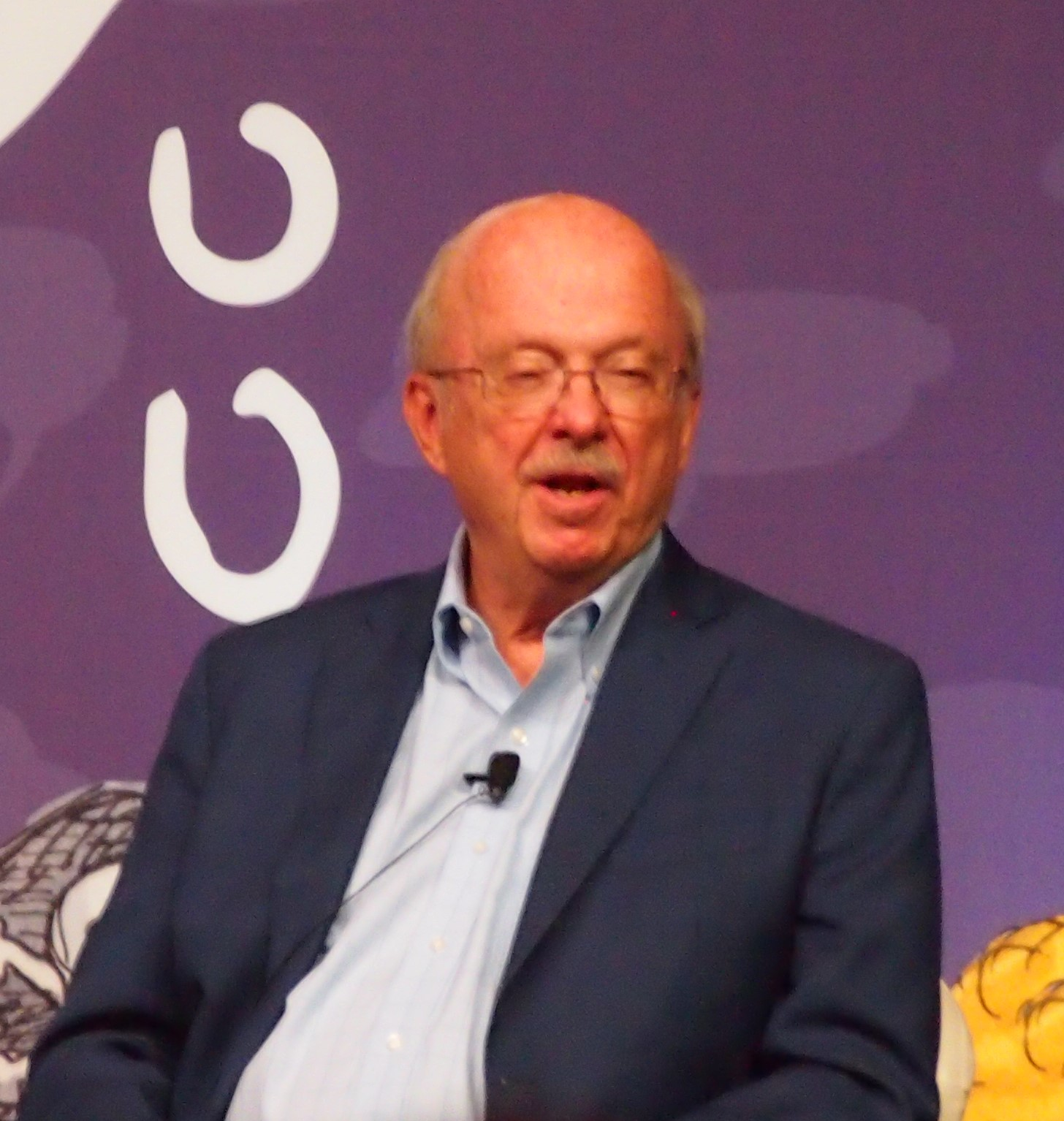
- Ronald C. White
- Born: May 22, 1939 (age 87); Minneapolis, Minnesota
- Education: University of California, Los Angeles (BA); Princeton Theological Seminary (MDiv); Princeton University (PhD)
- Occupation: Historian
- Spouse: Cynthia
- Children: Brad and Melissa
- Writing career
- Language: English
- Genre: Historical
- Notable works: The Eloquent President; Lincoln's Greatest Speech; A. Lincoln; American Ulysses
- Website: www.ronaldcwhite.com

Ronald Cedric "Ron" White Jr. (born May 22, 1939) is an American historian, author, and lecturer. He has written bestselling and award-winning biographies of Abraham Lincoln and Ulysses S. Grant, as well as three other books on Lincoln and a biography of Joshua Chamberlain. He is a senior fellow at the Trinity Forum.

== Education ==
Born on May 22, 1939, in Minneapolis, Minnesota, White is the son of Ronald C. and Evelyn Pearson White. He was educated at Lincoln Elementary School in Salinas, California; R. D. White Elementary School, and Woodrow Wilson Junior High School. White graduated from Glendale High School in Glendale, California, in 1957.

With an interest in both speech and journalism, White enrolled in Northwestern University in 1957. He transferred to UCLA in 1958, where he majored in American history. He graduated with a BA with honors in 1961.

White entered Princeton Theological Seminary in 1961 and graduated with an MDiv degree in 1964, winning the Seminary Prize in History.

From 1964 through 1968, while serving as a minister of the First Presbyterian Church in Colorado Springs, Colorado, White taught in the history department at Colorado College. In 1966–67 he served as a World Council of Churches Scholar in England, studying English church history at Lincoln Theological College in Lincoln, England. Returning to Colorado Springs, he became the founding director of the Martin Luther King Jr. Education Fund, created in April 1968 in response to the assassination of King.

Accepted into the Ph.D. program at Princeton University in 1968, White studied both in the religion department with professors John F. Wilson and Horton Davies, and in the history department with James M. McPherson and Arthur S. Link. Under their mentorship, he wrote a Ph.D. dissertation, "The Social Gospel and the Negro in the Progressive Era, 1890–1920." He received a Ph.D. from Princeton in 1972.

White taught at Rider College from 1972 to 1974 and at Whitworth College from 1974 to 1981. In 1975 he co-authored with C. Howard Hopkins The Social Gospel: Religion and Reform in Changing America. This book, still in print, pushed the boundaries chronologically and topically of the traditional interpretation of the Social Gospel to include African Americans, Jews, women, and the South.

White served as director of continuing education and taught church history at Princeton Theological Seminary from 1981 to 1988. In 1984 he offered the Walter Rauschenbusch Lectures at Colgate-Rochester Seminary. An expanded version of the lectures was published in 1990 as Liberty and Justice for All: Racial Reform and the Social Gospel.

== Books ==
White published two monographs: The Social Gospel: Religion and Reform in Changing America (HarperCollins, 1976) and Liberty and Justice for All: Racial Reform and the Social Gospel (Temple University Press, 1990).

=== Lincoln's Greatest Speech ===
In 2002 White authored Lincoln's Greatest Speech: The Second Inaugural. A Washington Post and San Francisco Chronicle bestseller, The New York Times selected it a Notable Book for 2002. James M. McPherson declared, "Lincoln thought the Second Inaugural to be his greatest speech—even more profound than the Gettysburg Address. Ronald C. White's remarkable analysis of the Second Inaugural will convince readers that Lincoln was right." David Herbert Donald called the book "both learned and accessible".

=== The Eloquent President ===
In 2005 White authored The Eloquent President: A Portrait of Lincoln Through His Words, a Los Angeles Times bestseller and a selection of the History Book Club. The Wall Street Journal observed, "Lincoln's eloquence was of such a rare kind. Ronald C. White captures its qualities admirably." The Washington Post judged it "splendid.... The Eloquent President is an insightful, highly readable exploration of literary genius."

=== A. Lincoln: A Biography ===
A. Lincoln: A Biography was published in 2009 during the bicentennial of Lincoln's birth. It was a New York Times, Washington Post, and Los Angeles Times bestseller. USA Today stated, "If you read one book about Lincoln, make it A. Lincoln." The biography was named one of the best books of 2009 by The Washington Post, Philadelphia Inquirer, St. Louis Post-Dispatch, Christian Science Monitor, and Barnes & Noble. Harold Holzer wrote: "Each generation requires—and seems to inspire—its own masterly one-volume Lincoln biography, and scholar Ronald C. White has crowned the bicentennial year with an instant classic for the twenty-first century." In 2010 A. Lincoln won a Christopher Award, which salutes books that "affirm the highest values of the human spirit".

In his review of A. Lincoln, historian David W. Blight wrote, "this thoroughly researched book belongs on the A-list of major biographies of the tall Illinoisan; it's a worthy companion for all who admire Lincoln's prose and his ability to see into, and explain, America's greatest crisis." Reviewer Phillip C. Stone wrote:

Ronald White's A. Lincoln: A Biography is readable, thorough, and thoughtful.... In a particularly insightful way, White describes Lincoln's development into a mature man, a successful politician and superior lawyer. He handles Lincoln's religious development particularly well. An early freethinker, Lincoln never joined a church but became increasingly religious. Even as a young man he appeared to be uninterested in joining the fundamentalist Baptist group of his parents, but he was certainly influenced by the Calvinistic determinism of his parents' faith. Later, when he became acquainted with well-educated and intellectual pastors, his interest in metaphysical matters grew and matured. In the same evolutionary way that his political and personal strengths developed, his religious views became stronger, partly because of his intellectual development and partly in response to the despair and anguish he experienced from the 1862 death of his son Willie and the hundreds of thousands of war casualties.

=== American Ulysses ===
In 2016, White published American Ulysses: A Life of Ulysses S. Grant, which became an instant New York Times bestseller. General (Ret.) David H. Petraeus declared, "Certain to be recognized as the classic work on Grant, American Ulysses is a monumental examination of one of the most compelling figures in American history." Jon Meacham wrote, "In this thorough and engaging new book, Ronald C. White restores U. S. Grant to the pantheon of great Americans." Presidential historian Richard Norton Smith stated, "Employing a perspective as fresh as his newly tapped sources, White at last solves the Grant Enigma—reconciling in character and ability the hero of Appomattox with the (allegedly) failed President. It is the biography that Grant deserves, and that only a scholar of the first rank can deliver."

Reviewer Richard G. Mannion, states regarding American Ulysses:

Scholarship of Ulysses S. Grant advances itself significantly with this marvelously written, meticulously researched biography of a man whose public memory not so long ago was in such decline that even "dogs did not like him". With 667 pages of text, over 100 pages of notes and an extensive bibliography which appears to include everything with "Grant" written on it other than a fifty-dollar bill, this book holds great appeal for both the scholar and casual reader alike.

=== Lincoln in Private: What His Most Personal Reflections Tell Us About Our Greatest President ===
In 2021, White published Lincoln in Private, which, historian Andrew F. Lang wrote, examines "109 surviving fragments or notes that feature what [Lincoln] called his 'best' (though often 'disconnected') thoughts. In scrawled penmanship, Lincoln explored a range of subjects: the mysteries of nature, a lawyer's public reputation, the immorality of slavery, the active role of God in human affairs. These notes—some no more than a few sentences, others multiple paragraphs—were not, according to Lincoln's personal secretaries, John Nicolay and John Hay, 'written to be seen by men'".

=== On Great Fields: The Life and Unlikely Heroism of Joshua Lawrence Chamberlain ===
In 2023, White published On Great Fields, a biography of Union General Joshua Chamberlain, who, as a colonel, played a decisive role in the Union victory at Gettysburg. Professor of American Literature Randall Fuller wrote:

The author is good at tracing Chamberlain's early life and his transformation from junior professor of rhetoric to unlikely war hero. He is somewhat more understated about the difficulties Chamberlain experienced once he returned to civilian life.... Historians of the postwar years describe a period in which white Northerners and Southerners slowly reunited at the expense of the African-American citizens freed by the conflict.... Chamberlain's life conforms to this dynamic.... "But for me," Mr. White concludes, "Chamberlain remains a hero nonetheless, a leader committed to magnanimity in the divided nation of his time".

== Family ==
Ron White is married to Cynthia Conger White and lives in La Canada, California. He has two adult children by a previous marriage.

== Awards ==
In 2010, A. Lincoln won a Christopher Award.

American Ulysses: A Life of Ulysses S. Grant won the William Henry Seward Award for "Excellence in Civil War Biography".

Lincoln in Private: What His Most Personal Reflections Tell Us About Our Greatest President received the 2021 Barnondess/Lincoln award.

In 2023, White received The Lincoln Forum's Richard Nelson Current Award of Achievement.
