= The Titans That Built America =

- Promotional Poster
- Genre: Biography; Docudrama
- Written by: Stephen David; Patrick Reams; Randy Counsman; Joey Allen
- Directed by: Patrick Reams; Phillip Montgomery
- Starring: Gerald Kyd; Grant Masters; Cillian O'Gairbhi; Peter O'Meara; David Crowley; Ian Toner; Charlie Maher
- Narrated by: Campbell Scott
- Country of origin: United States
- Original language: English
- No. of episodes: 6

Production
- Producers: Zachary Behr; Stephen David; Jennifer Davisson; Leonardo DiCaprio; Tim W. Kelly
- Cinematography: Aiden Gault; Joseph Ingersoll
- Editors: Sergey Akimov; Ryan Doyle; Brian McAllister; Jonathan Soule
- Production company: Stephen David Entertainment

Original release
- Network: History Channel
- Release: May 31 – June 2, 2021

Related
- The Men Who Built America: Frontiersmen; The Men Who Built America

The Titans That Built America is a six-hour, three-part miniseries docudrama which was originally broadcast on the History Channel on May 31, 2021. The series focuses on the lives of Pierre S. du Pont, Walter Chrysler, JP Morgan Jr., William Boeing, Henry Kaiser, Charles Lindbergh, William S. Knudsen, John Raskob, Edsel Ford, and Henry Ford. It serves as a sequel to The Men Who Built America.

The series won the 2022 Realscreen award for Best History & Biography Program.

It is the sixth installment of the That Built franchise.

== Cast ==
- Gerald Kyd as Pierre S. du Pont
- Grant Masters as Henry Ford
- Cillian O'Gairbhi as Walter Chrysler
- Peter O'Meara as J. P. Morgan Jr.
- David Crowley as Edsel Ford
- Ian Toner as William Boeing
- Peter Gaynor as Henry J. Kaiser
- Charlie Maher as Charles Lindbergh
- Aidan O'Hare as William S. Knudsen
- Jonathan Delaney Tynan as John J. Raskob
- Graham Wilkinson as Franklin D. Roosevelt
- Vincent Tsang as Wong Tsu

== Episodes ==
Six individual episodes were produced for the series; however, for the program's initial broadcast on History Channel, they were combined into three episodes.

No.	Title	Directed by	Written by	Original release date
1	"A New Generation Arises"	Patrick Reams & Phillip Montgomery	Stephen David, Joey Allen, Patrick Reams	May 31, 2021
2	"A New Generation Arises"	Patrick Reams & Phillip Montgomery	Stephen David, Joey Allen, Patrick Reams	May 31, 2021
In the aftermath of World War I, a new generation of Titans rises from the ashes as America starts to thrive once again. After Henry Ford becomes the number one automobile maker in the nation, Pierre DuPont moves on from munitions to finance General Motors. During the Roaring Twenties, engineer Walter Chrysler joins in to build a better and faster vehicle under his own name. However, the aviation industry is taking flight and Edsel Ford and William Boeing, along with famous pilot Charles Lindbergh want to be household names. It's an all out battle to outshine and outsmart each other to be the Titans of new industry supremacy.
3	"Titans vs. FDR"	Patrick Reams & Phillip Montgomery	Stephen David, Joey Allen, Patrick Reams	June 1, 2021
4	"Titans vs. FDR"	Patrick Reams & Phillip Montgomery	Stephen David, Joey Allen, Patrick Reams	June 1, 2021
When the Stock Market crashes on Wall Street in October 1929 (one day after the Chrysler Building opened), the nation descends into the Great Depression two years later. Banker J.P. Morgan Jr. and du Pont help get a new leader, Franklin Delano Roosevelt, elected as the next U.S. president. However, FDR curbs the Titans capitalism by proposing a bold New Deal to save the American people from financial ruin. He enlists Henry Kaiser to design the Hoover Dam. As the industrialists struggle to save their big businesses from collapse, they may get an opportunity in the impending war in Europe. America must build up their military to match the super powers of Germany and Japan.
5	"United They Stand"	Patrick Reams & Phillip Montgomery	Stephen David, Joey Allen, Patrick Reams	June 2, 2021
6	"United They Stand"	Patrick Reams & Phillip Montgomery	Stephen David, Joey Allen, Patrick Reams	June 2, 2021
After a surprise attack on Pearl Harbor changes America's plan to stay out of war, FDR needs to make peace with the Titans he made into the country's enemies. He needs their industrial might to build the greatest war machines ever made. But in order to confront this global threat, the Titans must keep their egos in check by choosing patriotism over profit, and unite with the U.S. government. Du Pont is back making munitions, as well as helping J. Robert Oppenheimer create the Atomic Bomb. Ford, with Edsel's idea, assemble B-24 Bombers. Chrysler's engineers design Sherman tanks, and Kaiser takes over shipyards to build Liberty ships. The first nuclear reactor is built at the Hanford Site in Washington state.
