= The World Wars (miniseries) =

- Genre: Historical Drama; Docudrama
- Written by: David C. White; John Ealer; Alec Michod; Chelsea Coates; Jordan Rosenblum; David Schaye
- Directed by: John Ealer
- Narrated by: Jeremy Renner
- Theme music composer: The 13 Brotherhood
- Country of origin: United States
- Original language: English
- No. of episodes: 3

Production
- Producers: Stephen David; Russ McCarroll; Paul Cabana; Elaine Frontain Bryant; Christian Murphy; Brian Burstein; David C. White; Tim W. Kelly; Randy Counsman
- Cinematography: Roger Chingirian
- Editors: Tim W. Kelly; Jonathan Soule
- Production company: Stephen David Entertainment
- Budget: was

Original release
- Network: History; H2
- Release: May 26 – May 28, 2014

The World Wars is a three-part, six-hour event miniseries by the History Channel that premiered on Monday, May 26, 2014, (Memorial Day) airing for three consecutive nights. An extended version of the series, divided into six episodes with never before seen footage, was subsequently broadcast on H2 and in more than 160 countries on June 22, 2014.

Narrated by Jeremy Renner, the documentary series features a mix of dramatic reenactments, archival stills and footage, and interviews with historians and authors alongside current and former prominent political figures such as former U.S. Senator John McCain from Arizona, former U.S. General and Secretary of State Colin Powell, former British prime minister John Major, former Italian Prime Minister Mario Monti, former U.S. Defense Secretary Leon Panetta, former U.K. Foreign Secretary David Miliband and many more.

The show was produced for History Channel by Stephen David Entertainment, the production company behind the Emmy Award-winning miniseries The Men Who Built America. A portion of the filming took place in and around Martinsburg, West Virginia in the United States during October and November 2013. The series was introduced by United States President Barack Obama in a pre-recorded message.

== Overview ==
According to the History Channel, the miniseries "showcase(s) the thirty year period that changed the course of human history", documenting both World Wars and the interwar era in a continuous timeline from 1914 to 1945. The series takes a personality-driven approach, focusing on some of the key players of World War II (Hitler, Mussolini, Patton, Stalin, Churchill, Roosevelt), and chronicling how their experiences as younger men in the First World War shaped them into the leaders they became in World War II.

== Cast ==
The series features two actors for each of the main characters, one young (during WWI) and one older (during World War II and its lead-up).

- Winston Churchill – Ian Beyts
- Young Churchill – Tom Vickers
- Charles De Gaulle – Don Meehan
- Young De Gaulle – Michael Perrie
- Adolf Hitler – Hugh Scully
- Young Hitler – Maximilian Klas
- Douglas MacArthur – Dan Berkey
- Young MacArthur – Prescott Hathaway

- Benito Mussolini – Jonathan Hartman
- Young Mussolini – Nabil Vinas
- George S. Patton – Don Hartman
- Young Patton – Matt Dearman
- Franklin Delano Roosevelt – Dino Gigaliano
- Young Roosevelt – Kevin McKillip
- Joseph Stalin – Joseph Scott Barbarino
- Young Stalin – Jacopo Rampini

- Hideki Tojo – Isao Ota
- Young Tojo – Koji Oshashi
- Vladimir Lenin – C. Conrad Cady
- Bernard Montgomery – Joe Bevilacqua
- Harry S. Truman – David Mitchum Brown
- Woodrow Wilson – Judd Bankert
- George Marshall – Sewell Whitney

== Experts ==
The following people appear as talking head experts throughout the series.

Politicians/Military Figures:

- Dick Cheney
- Joe Lieberman
- John Major
- John McCain
- Stanley McChrystal
- Mario Monti
- David Miliband
- Richard Myers
- Leon Panetta
- Colin Powell
- Donald Rumsfeld

Historians/Authors:

- Michael Beschloss
- Richard Bosworth
- H. W. Brands
- Douglas Brinkley
- Johann Chapoutot
- Richard Connaughton
- Richard Evans
- Robert Gellately
- Steven Gillon
- Max Hastings
- Sönke Neitzel
- Paul Reid
- Ron Rosenbaum
- Adam Tooze

== Episodes ==
No.	Title	Directed by	Written by	Original release date	U.S. viewers (millions)
1	"Trial by Fire"	John Ealer	David C. White	May 26, 2014	3.4
An assassin’s bullet sparks a global conflict that quickly evolves into the deadliest war humanity has ever seen. In the chaos, a new generation of soldier emerges, including a group of men who would become the most infamous leaders of the 20th century. The show began with a brief introduction recorded by United States President Barack Obama and a quote by Winston Churchill: "One must regard these 30 years of strife in Europe as part of one story...one story of a 30 years' war."
2	"A Rising Threat"	John Ealer	David C. White	May 27, 2014	2.8
3	"Never Surrender"	John Ealer	David C. White	May 28, 2014	3.3

=== Expanded version ===
During the expanded re-airings during June, instead of three episodes, the series was split into six episodes.

No.	Title	Original release date
1	"Trial by Fire"	June 22, 2014
An assassin's bullet starts a global conflict that escalates into a deadly war; a new generation of soldiers emerges, including future world leaders such as Winston Churchill, Charles De Gaulle, Adolf Hitler, Benito Mussolini, and Joseph Stalin; tanks and chemical weapons enter the battlefield.
2	"The Price of Glory"	June 22, 2014
The Allies turn Germany away from France; leaders are dissatisfied with the Treaty of Versailles; Germany's economy collapses with the end of the war; Hitler begins his rise to power; Lenin overthrows the tsarist government in Russia.
3	"The Rising Tide"	June 23, 2014
The entire world plunges into an economic depression; Josef Stalin seizes power; Japan makes plans to dominate Asia; Adolf Hitler begins taking back the territory Germany lost.
4	"The Storm Explodes"	June 23, 2014
Hitler takes over Czechoslovakia; Stalin and Hitler sign a shocking pact; Churchill rises to Prime Minister as Hitler invades Poland; Hitler betrays Stalin; the United States is threatened by Japan's increasingly bold actions near the United States-controlled Philippines.
5	"Never Surrender"	June 24, 2014
The Japanese attack on Pearl Harbor brings the United States into the war; Germany almost takes Moscow; the Nazis continue to execute the Jews of Europe; the Allies gain a victory at the Battle of Midway.
6	"Peace at Last"	June 24, 2014
Stalin, Churchill and Roosevelt meet to discuss an invasion of Europe; D-Day is launched and the Allies defeat Hitler on the beaches of Normandy; Hitler tries to retaliate; the war ends when Hitler commits suicide and Japan surrenders.

"Trial by Fire" and "Never Surrender", episodes 1 and 5 of the expanded six-part series, use the same names as episodes 1 and 3 of the original three part series with two hour episodes.

== Home media ==
On September 9, 2014, the miniseries was released on DVD and Blu-ray Disc formats. The two-disc includes English subtitles and bonus material, such as deleted scenes of over an hour of footage cut from the original U.S. broadcast; "Characters In Depth" of Churchill, Stalin, Truman, Roosevelt, Eisenhower, and Hitler; and 10 featurettes on both wars. UltraViolet digital copies of each episode were also included.
