= H. W. Brands =

American historian (born 1953)

H.W. Brands
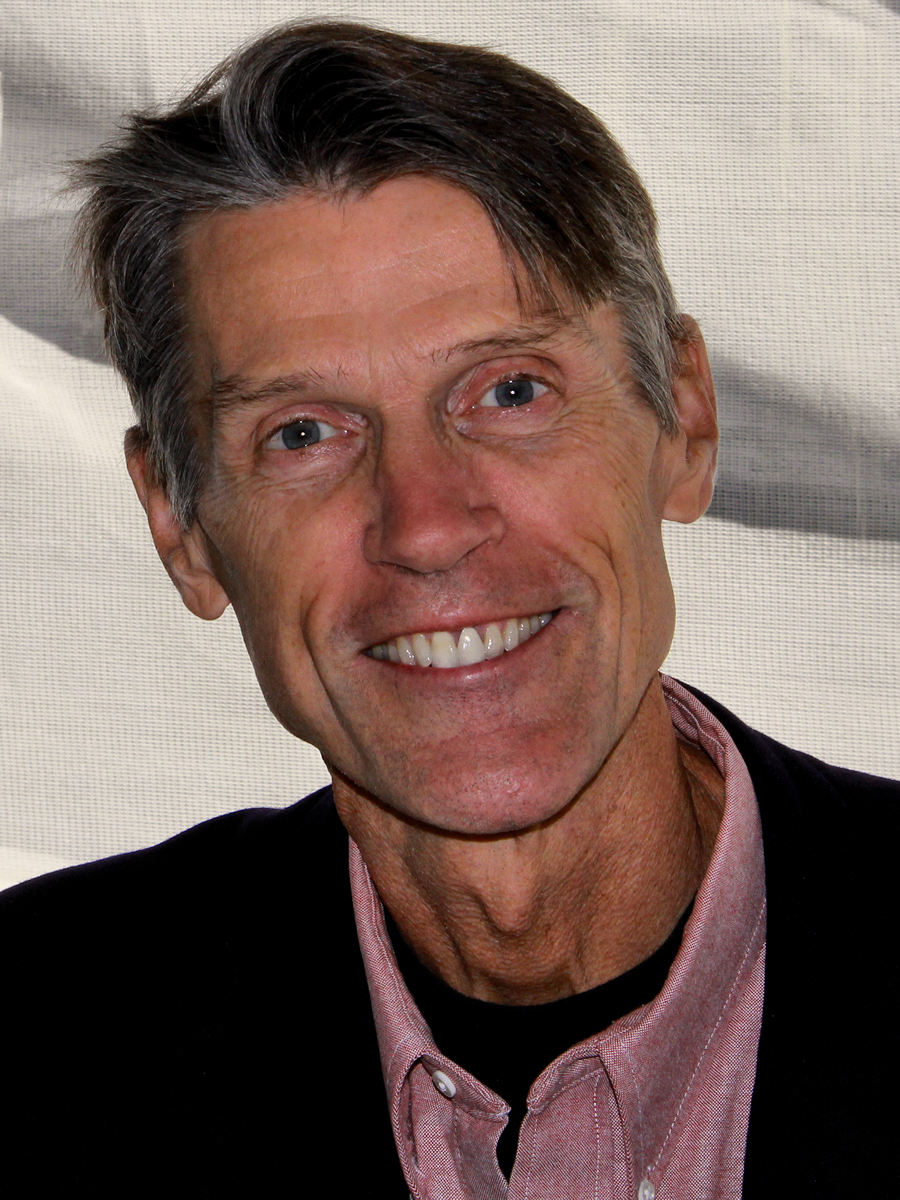
- Brands at the 2012 Texas Book Festival
- Born: August 7, 1953 (age 73); Portland, Oregon, U.S
- Children: Hal Brands

Academic background
- Education: Stanford University (BA); Reed College (MA); Portland State University (MS); University of Texas at Austin (PhD)
- Doctoral advisor: Robert A. Divine

Academic work
- Discipline: History
- Sub-discipline: American history
- Institutions: Austin Community College District; Vanderbilt University; Texas A&M University; University of Texas at Austin
- Main interests: American history

Henry William Brands Jr. (born August 7, 1953) is an American historian. He holds the Jack S. Blanton Sr. Chair in History at the University of Texas at Austin, where he earned his PhD in history in 1985. He has authored more than thirty books on U.S. history. His works have twice been selected as finalists for the Pulitzer Prize.

== Early life and education ==
Born in 1953, Brands grew up in Oregon in the Portland metropolitan area. He attended Jesuit High School, where he was a three-sport athlete and National Merit Scholar. Brands enrolled at Stanford University, where he studied mathematics and history. After receiving his undergraduate degree in history in 1975, he worked for a year doing sales in his family's cutlery business before returning to Jesuit High School to teach mathematics. He taught at the high school for the next five years. While doing so he earned an MA in liberal studies from Reed College in 1978, followed by an MS in mathematics from Portland State in 1981. During this period he came to realize that he wanted to write for a living, and determined his love of history might provide an avenue for him to do so. He enrolled at the University of Texas at Austin to study under historian Robert A. Divine. He wrote his dissertation on the Eisenhower administration and its foreign policy during the Cold War, earning his PhD in history in 1985.

== Academic career ==
While working on his doctorate, Brands taught social studies and math courses—world history, U.S. history, algebra, and calculus—at Kirby Hall School and Austin Community College District. His preferred mode of transit was his bicycle, as he commuted between classes at the University of Texas and his teaching responsibilities at the college preparatory school on the fringe of the UT campus and ACC's Rio Grande site in Central Austin. In his first year after completing his doctorate, Brands worked as an oral historian at the University of Texas School of Law. The following year he taught at Vanderbilt University. In 1987 he accepted an academic post at Texas A&M University, where he remained for the next seventeen years. He made the daily commute from his home in Austin to teach in College Station. In 2005, he joined the faculty at the University of Texas at Austin, where he was formerly the Dickson Allen Anderson Centennial Professor of History and Professor of Government and now holds the Jack S. Blanton Sr. Chair in History.

== Writings ==
Examples of Brands' biographical histories include his biographies on Benjamin Franklin, covering the colonial period and the Revolutionary War; Andrew Jackson, covering the War of 1812, western expansion and the conflict over the National Bank; Ulysses S. Grant, covering the Civil War and Reconstruction; Theodore Roosevelt, covering the Industrial Era and the Progressive Movement; and Franklin D. Roosevelt, covering the Great Depression, the New Deal, the Second World War, and the ascension of the U.S. as an international power.

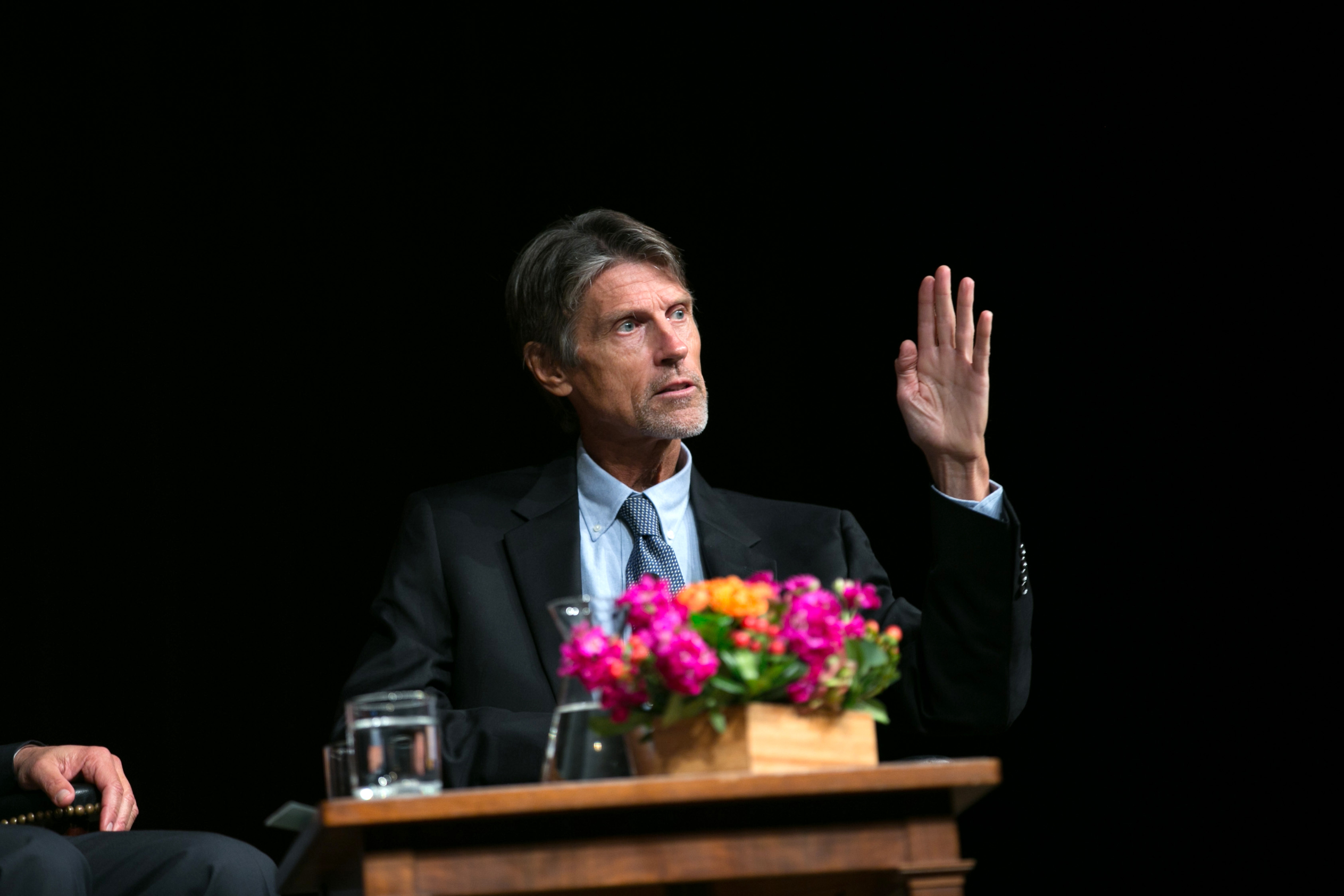
Brands at the LBJ Presidential Library in 2015

He holds a progressive view of the nation's founders and the United States Constitution, arguing that the founders were at heart radicals who were willing to challenge the status quo in search of a better future. That being so, he believes that Americans today should not be constrained by the views of self-government held by the founders. "In revering the founders we undervalue ourselves and sabotage our own efforts to make necessary improvements in the republican experiment they began. Our love of the founders leads us to abandon and even betray the principles they fought for." He believes the framers would not want the Constitution to be interpreted by the idea of original intent, and believes that we are in error when we view the founders in a "deified" way. "The one thing that [the Founders] did have was an audacity to challenge conventional wisdom."

Brands believes that Americans place too much importance on the individual in the White House. "We have this very interesting relationship with the presidents where the president is supposed to be one of us, but on the other hand he represents everybody so he is sort of above all of us. We make too much of presidents, but we can hardly help ourselves." Though noting how the power of the presidency has increased greatly since the start of the twentieth century, when the United States emerged as a significant world power and U.S. foreign policy became far more important, Brands believes that popular focus on the president is excessive. "We have a cult of the president, where we make too big a deal of the president."

In addition to his works on U.S. history, Brands has written books on the economic development of the United States and biographies of key leaders in corporate America. His books are known for their readability and narrative thrust. He has authored over thirty books and produced numerous articles that have been featured in newspapers and magazines. His writings have received critical and popular acclaim. The First American was a finalist for the Pulitzer Prize and the Los Angeles Times Prize, as well as a New York Times bestseller. The Age of Gold was a Washington Post Best Book of 2002 and a San Francisco Chronicle bestseller. Andrew Jackson was a Chicago Tribune Best Book of 2005 and a Washington Post bestseller. What America Owes the World was a finalist for the Lionel Gelber Prize in international affairs. The Wages of Globalism was a Choice Outstanding Academic Book winner. Lone Star Nation won the Deolece Parmelee Award. Traitor to His Class: The Privileged Life and Radical Presidency of Franklin Delano Roosevelt was his second finalist for the Pulitzer Prize. He has appeared in the documentaries The Presidents (2005), 10 Days That Unexpectedly Changed America (2006), America: The Story of Us (2010), The Men Who Built America (2012), The World Wars (2014), and The Eighties (2016). His writings have been published in several countries and translated into German, French, Russian, Chinese, Japanese, and Korean.

== Bibliography ==
Brands has also co-authored various editions of various history textbooks, including America: Past and Present, and American Stories: A History of The United States.

Title	Year	ISBN	Publisher	Subject matter	Interviews, presentations, and reviews	Comments
Cold Warriors: Eisenhower's Generation and American Foreign Policy	1988	ISBN 9780231065269	Columbia University Press	Foreign policy of the Dwight D. Eisenhower administration		
The Specter of Neutralism: The United States and the Emergence of the Third World, 1947-1960	1989	ISBN 9780231071680	Columbia University Press			
India and the United States: The Cold Peace	1990	ISBN 9780805792072	Twayne Publishers	India–United States relations		
Inside the Cold War: Loy Henderson and the Rise of the American Empire, 1918-1961	1991	ISBN 9780195067071	Oxford University Press	Loy W. Henderson		
Bound to Empire: The United States and the Philippines	1992	ISBN 9780195071047	Oxford University Press	Philippines–United States relations		
The Devil We Knew: Americans and the Cold War	1993	ISBN 9780195074994	Oxford University Press	Cold War history of the United States		
Into the Labyrinth: The United States and the Middle East, 1945-1993	1994	ISBN 9780070071889	McGraw-Hill	United States foreign policy in the Middle East		
The United States in the World: A History of American Foreign Policy	1994	ISBN 9780395621806	Houghton Mifflin	Foreign policy of the United States		
The Reckless Decade: America in the 1890s	1995	ISBN 9780312135942	St. Martin's Press	1890s in the United States	Booknotes interview with Brands on The Reckless Decade, February 25, 1996, C-SPAN	
Since Vietnam: The United States in World Affairs, 1973-1995	1995	ISBN 9780070071964	McGraw-Hill			
The Wages of Globalism: Lyndon Johnson and the Limits of American Power	1995	ISBN 9780195078886	Oxford University Press	Foreign policy of the Lyndon B. Johnson administration		
TR: The Last Romantic	1997	ISBN 9780465069583	Basic Books	Theodore Roosevelt	Presentation by Brands on T.R.: The Last Romantic, October 18, 2002, C-SPAN	
What America Owes the World: The Struggle for the Soul of Foreign Policy	1998	ISBN 9780521630313	Cambridge University Press	Foreign policy of the United States		Shortlisted for the Lionel Gelber Prize, 1999
The Foreign Policies of Lyndon Johnson: Beyond Vietnam	1999	ISBN 9780890968734	Texas A&M University Press	Foreign policy of the Lyndon B. Johnson administration		Edited by Brands
Masters of Enterprise: Giants of American Business from John Jacob Astor and J. P. Morgan to Bill Gates and Oprah Winfrey	1999	ISBN 9780684854731	Free Press			
Critical Reflections on the Cold War: Linking Rhetoric and History	2000	ISBN 9780890969434	Texas A&M University Press			Edited by Brands and Martin J. Medhurst
The First American: The Life and Times of Benjamin Franklin	2000	ISBN 9780385493284	Doubleday	Benjamin Franklin	Presentation by Brands on The First American, October 5, 2000, C-SPAN	Finalist for the 2001 Pulitzer Prize for Biography or Autobiography
The Use of Force after the Cold War	2000	ISBN 9780890969281	Texas A&M University Press			Edited by Brands
The Selected Letters of Theodore Roosevelt	2001	ISBN 9780815411260	Cooper Square Press	Theodore Roosevelt		Edited by Brands
The Strange Death of American Liberalism	2001	ISBN 9780300090215	Yale University Press			
The Age of Gold: The California Gold Rush and the New American Dream	2002	ISBN 9780385502160	Doubleday	California Gold Rush	Presentation by Brands on The Age of Gold, September 19, 2002, C-SPAN	
Woodrow Wilson	2003	ISBN 9780805069556	Times Books	Woodrow Wilson		American Presidents series
Lone Star Nation: The Epic Story of the Battle for Texas Independence	2004	ISBN 9780385507370	Doubleday			
Andrew Jackson: His Life and Times	2005	ISBN 9780385507387	Doubleday	Andrew Jackson	Presentation by Brands on Andrew Jackson: A Life and Times, October 9, 2005, C-SPAN; Presentation by Brands on Andrew Jackson: A Life and Times, November 8, 2013, C-SPAN	
The Money Men: Capitalism, Democracy, and the Hundred Years' War Over the American Dollar	2006	ISBN 9780393061840	W. W. Norton	Economic history of the United States, United States dollar, Alexander Hamilton, J.P. Morgan, Nicholas Biddle, Jay Cooke, Jay Gould	Interview with Brands on The Money Men, October 29, 2006, C-SPAN	
Traitor to His Class: The Privileged Life and Radical Presidency of Franklin Delano Roosevelt	2008	ISBN 9780385519588	Doubleday	Franklin D. Roosevelt, Presidency of Franklin D. Roosevelt, first and second terms, Presidency of Franklin D. Roosevelt, third and fourth terms	Presentation by Brands on Traitor to His Class, November 10, 2008, C-SPAN; Washington Journal interview with Brands on Traitor to His Class, December 17, 2008, C-SPAN; Presentation by Brands on Traitor to His Class, Pritzker Military Museum & Library, January 22, 2009	Finalist for the 2009 Pulitzer Prize for Biography or Autobiography
American Colossus: The Triumph of Capitalism, 1865–1900	2010	ISBN 9780385523332	Doubleday	Economic history of the United States#Late 19th century	Presentation by Brands on American Colossus at the Pritzker Military Museum & Library on November 4, 2010	
American Dreams: The United States Since 1945	2010	ISBN 9781594202629	Penguin Press	History of the United States (1945–1964), History of the United States (1964–1980), History of the United States (1980–1991), History of the United States (1991–2008)	Presentation by Brands on American Dreams, June 16, 2010, C-SPAN	
Greenback Planet: How the Dollar Conquered the World and Threatened Civilization as We Know It	2011	ISBN 9780292723412	University of Texas Press	United States dollar, International use of the U.S. dollar		
The Murder of Jim Fisk for the Love of Josie Mansfield	2011	ISBN 9780307743251	Anchor Books	Jim Fisk, Josie Mansfield		American Portraits series
The Heartbreak of Aaron Burr	2012	ISBN 9780307743268	Anchor Books	Aaron Burr	Presentation by Brands on The Heartbreak of Aaron Burr, May 10, 2012, C-SPAN	American Portraits series
The Man Who Saved the Union: Ulysses Grant in War and Peace	2012	ISBN 9780385532419	Doubleday	Ulysses S. Grant, Ulysses S. Grant and the American Civil War, Presidency of Ulysses S. Grant	Presentation by Brands on The Man Who Saved the Union, October 28, 2012, C-SPAN	
Reagan: The Life	2015	ISBN 9780385536394	Doubleday	Ronald Reagan	Presentation by Brands on Reagan: A Life, June 5, 2015, C-SPAN; Presentation by Brands on Reagan: A Life, October 17, 2015, C-SPAN	
The General vs. the President: MacArthur and Truman at the Brink of Nuclear War	2016	ISBN 9780385540575	Doubleday	Relief of Douglas MacArthur	Presentation by Brands on The General vs. the President, October 27, 2016, C-SPAN	
Heirs of the Founders: The Epic Rivalry of Henry Clay, John Calhoun and Daniel Webster, the Second Generation of American Giants	2018	ISBN 9780385542531	Doubleday	The Great Triumvirate, Henry Clay, John Calhoun, Daniel Webster	Interview with Brands on Heirs of the Founders, March 2, 2019, C-SPAN	
Dreams of El Dorado: A History of the American West	2019	ISBN 9781541672529	Basic Books	American frontier	Presentation by Brands on Dreams of El Dorado, October 22, 2019, C-SPAN	
The Zealot and the Emancipator: John Brown, Abraham Lincoln and the Struggle for American Freedom	2020	ISBN 9780385544009	Doubleday	John Brown, Abraham Lincoln and slavery, Abolitionism in the United States	Presentation by Brands on The Zealot and the Emancipator, October 22, 2020, C-SPAN	
Our First Civil War: Patriots and Loyalists in the American Revolution	2021	ISBN 9780385546515	Anchor Books	American Revolution, Patriots, Loyalists	Interview with Brands on Our First Civil War, November 15, 2021, C-SPAN	
The Last Campaign: Sherman, Geronimo and the War for America	2022	ISBN 9780385547284	Anchor Books	William Tecumseh Sherman, Geronimo, Apache Wars		
Founding Partisans: Hamilton, Madison, Jefferson, Adams and the Brawling Birth of American Politics	2023	ISBN 9780385549240	Doubleday	Alexander Hamilton, James Madison, Thomas Jefferson, John Adams	Presentation by Brands on Founding Partisans, June 30, 2023, C-SPAN	
America First: Roosevelt vs. Lindbergh in the Shadow of War	2024	ISBN 9780385550413	Doubleday	Franklin D. Roosevelt, Charles Lindbergh, isolationism versus intervention in World War II	Brands, H. W., "America first? Or the United States as the leader of the free world?" The Washington Post, September 12, 2024	
American Patriarch: The Life of George Washington	2026	ISBN 9780385551564	Doubleday	George Washington		
