= That Built =

American television franchise

That Built is an American television franchise a docudrama broadcast on The History Channel that covers various historic subjects and the notable people involved roughly spanning the Industrial Revolution of the 1860s to the present. The series started with the miniseries The Men Who Built America in 2012.

To date, the longest running of these series is The Food That Built America, which premiered on August 11, 2019. The seventh season premiered on April 19, 2026.

== List ==
- The Men Who Built America (2012)
- The Cars That Made America (2017)
- The Men Who Built America: Frontiersmen (2018)
- The Food That Built America (2019–)
- The Cars That Built the World (2021)
- The Titans That Built America (2021)
- The Machines That Built America (2021)
- The Engineering That Built the World (2021)
- The Toys That Built America (2021–2023)
- The Booze, Bets and Sex That Built America(2022)
- The Mega-Brands That Built America(2023)
- How Disney Built America (2024)
- The Icons That Built America (2024)
