= The Toys That Built America =

American television documentary series

- Genre: Historical
- Country of origin: United States
- Original language: English
- No. of seasons: 3
- No. of episodes: 26

Original release
- Network: History Channel
- Release: November 28, 2021 – December 17, 2023

The Toys That Built America is an American nonfiction docudrama series that premiered on the History Channel on November 28, 2021. Each episode outlines the development of a popular toy, invention, or company in the United States, typically focusing on their rise and any rivals or struggles. Historical events in the relevant timelines are re-enacted for dramatic effect and interspersed with commentary by toy historians, business experts, and toy enthusiasts.

It is the ninth installment of the That Built franchise.

== Episodes ==
=== Series overview ===
| Season | Episodes | Originally released | |
| Season | Episodes | First released | Last released |
|---|---|---|---|
| 1 | 4 | November 28, 2021 | December 19, 2021 |
| 2 | 10 | October 23, 2022 | December 11, 2022 |
| 3 | 12 | October 15, 2023 | December 17, 2023 |

=== Season 1 (2021) ===
| No. overall | No. in season | Title | Original release date | Prod. code | U.S. viewers (millions) |
|---|---|---|---|---|---|
| 1 | 1 | "Masters of Invention" | November 28, 2021 | 101 | 1.11 |
The beginnings of Slinky, Silly Putty, and company Wham-O (with Hula hoop), all toys that were born by chance.
| 2 | 2 | "Clash of the Toy Titans" | December 5, 2021 | 102 | 0.97 |
The beginnings of Mattel and Hasbro, with most of the episode focusing on Barbie and G.I. Joe.
| 3 | 3 | "Toy Car Wars" | December 12, 2021 | 103 | 0.87 |
The rise of the once famous toy car brand Matchbox, and later on, the emergence of its rival, Hot Wheels.
| 4 | 4 | "Board Game Empires" | December 19, 2021 | 104 | 0.88 |
The start of two famous board game companies: Milton Bradley and Parker Brothers.

=== Season 2 (2022) ===
| No. overall | No. in season | Title | Original release date | Prod. code | U.S. viewers (millions) |
|---|---|---|---|---|---|
| 5 | 1 | "Masters of the Toy Universe" | October 23, 2022 | 201 | 0.49 |
This episode focuses on action figures, in particular the toys related to Star Wars, Battlestar Galactica and Masters of the Universe.
| 6 | 2 | "The Birth of Video Games" | October 30, 2022 | 202 | 0.54 |
The history of video games, from the moment Ralph Baer starts working on Pong to the video game crash of 1983.
| 7 | 3 | "The Idea Man" | November 6, 2022 | 203 | 0.56 |
The legacy of Marvin Glass, whose ideas eventually bring to the world some of the most iconic toys of America.
| 8 | 4 | "Brick by Brick" | November 13, 2022 | 204 | 0.43 |
The history of two toy brands that let people build what they want: Erector and Lego.
| 9 | 5 | "Order Out of Chaos" | November 20, 2022 | 205 | 0.48 |
The creation of Rubik's Cube, Jenga and Tetris.
| 10 | 6 | "Cabbage Clash" | November 27, 2022 | 206 | 0.50 |
From Martha Nelson's design, come Cabbage Patch Kids, and later on, Garbage Pail Kids.
| 11 | 7 | "80's Tech Toys" | December 4, 2022 | 207 | 0.67 |
The origin story of Teddy Ruxpin and Super Soaker.
| 12 | 8 | "Plumber Bros vs. Hedgehog" | December 11, 2022 | 208 | 0.42 |
Continuation of episode 2, this episode talks about the revival of the video game industry, with the console war between Nintendo, Sega, and later on, Sony's PlayStation.
| 13 | 9 | "Gross Out Icons" | December 11, 2022 | 209 | 0.41 |
A 30-minute special, this episode highlights some of the most notable gross-out toys, like Whoopee cushion, Slime, Madballs, Garbage Pail Kids and more.
| 14 | 10 | "Christmas Crazes" | December 11, 2022 | 210 | 0.37 |
A 30-minute special, this episode highlights the toys that once caused shopping craze in America: Cabbage Patch Kids, Tickle Me Elmo, Beanie Babies and Furbies. Along with that, is a brief history about Black Friday.

=== Season 3 (2023) ===
| No. overall | No. in season | Title | Original release date | Prod. code | U.S. viewers (millions) |
|---|---|---|---|---|---|
| 15 | 1 | "Transforming Toy Invasion" | October 15, 2023 | 301 | 0.40 |
The origin story of Tonka's GoBots and Hasbro's Transformers. Two toys with the same idea of transformable robots, both knew nothing about each other until late into development.
| 16 | 2 | "Mind Game Masters" | October 22, 2023 | 302 | 0.31 |
The origin story of Yahtzee, Scrabble and Cluedo, three simple board games that are also pretty challenging to play and win.
| 17 | 3 | "Video Game Visionaries" | October 29, 2023 | 303 | 0.45 |
The origin story of three iconic franchises published by Nintendo: Mario, The Legend of Zelda and Pokémon.
| 18 | 4 | "Game Night Legends" | November 5, 2023 | 304 | 0.26 |
The story behind the creation of Trivia Pursuit. That game would eventually help Pictionary come to life.
| 19 | 5 | "Mighty Mutant Mayhem" | November 12, 2023 | 305 | 0.34 |
The two big series that slowly cement themselves as iconic figures in America's pop culture: Teenage Mutant Ninja Turtles and Power Rangers.
| 20 | 6 | "Old Games, New Twists" | November 26, 2023 | 306 | 0.27 |
The story behind the creation of UNO and Connect Four.
| 21 | 7 | "Happy Accidents" | December 3, 2023 | 307 | 0.31 |
From mundane materials and accidental discoveries, come two legendary toys: Etch A Sketch and Play-Doh.
| 22 | 8 | "The Santa That America Built" | December 10, 2023 | 308 | 0.44 |
How Santa Claus was shaped and defined in America through the years.
| 23 | 9 | "90's Fad Toys" | December 10, 2023 | 309 | 0.36 |
| 24 | 10 | "Hottest Wheels" | December 10, 2023 | 310 | 0.33 |
| 25 | 11 | "The Prank Toy Race" | December 17, 2023 | 311 | 0.29 |
| 26 | 12 | "Most Valuable Toys" | December 17, 2023 | 312 | 0.29 |
