= David C. White =

American writer and producer

David C. White is an American writer and producer, best known for writing the 2015 History Channel miniseries Sons of Liberty.

== Early life and education ==
White was educated at Oyster River High School in Durham, New Hampshire, graduating in 2000. He went on to attend the University of New Hampshire, also in Durham, where he majored in Communications with a minor in English, graduating in 2005.

== Career ==
In 2012, White wrote and produced the History Channel docudrama miniseries The Men Who Built America, for which he was nominated for two Primetime Emmys. The following year, he wrote and produced a follow-up History Channel docudrama series, The World Wars, which led to another pair of Emmy nominations.

In 2014, White co-wrote the scripted miniseries Sons of Liberty, which premiered on January 25, 2015. In December 2015, he was nominated for a Writers Guild of America Award for his work on the show.

== Filmography ==
=== Television ===
Year	Title	Role	Notes
2012	The Men Who Built America	Producer, Writer	
2014	The World Wars	Producer, Writer	
2015	Sons of Liberty	Writer	
2019	Surveillance	Writer	

== Awards and nominations ==
Year	Award	Recipient	Category	Result
2013	Primetime Emmy	The Men Who Built America	Outstanding Documentary or Nonfiction Series	Nominated
2013	Primetime Emmy	The Men Who Built America	Outstanding Writing for Nonfiction Programming	Nominated
2014	Primetime Emmy	The World Wars	Outstanding Documentary or Nonfiction Series	Nominated
2014	Primetime Emmy	The World Wars	Outstanding Writing for Nonfiction Programming	Nominated
2016	Writers Guild of America Award	Sons of Liberty	Outstanding Writing for Longform Original Programming	Nominated
