= Sons of Liberty (miniseries) =

2015 American TV miniseries

- Genre: Historical drama
- Written by: Stephen David; David C. White; Kirk Ellis
- Directed by: Kari Skogland
- Starring: Ben Barnes; Marton Csokas; Ryan Eggold; Michael Raymond-James; Rafe Spall; Henry Thomas; Jason O'Mara; Dean Norris; Sean Gilder
- Theme music composer: Hans Zimmer
- Composer: Lorne Balfe
- Country of origin: United States
- Original language: English
- No. of episodes: 3

Production
- Executive producers: Stephen David; Elaine Frontain Bryant; Matthew Gross; Russell McCarroll
- Producers: Mitch Engel; Tim W. Kelly; Peter Feldman; Matthew Stillman; David Minkowski
- Production locations: Buftea, Romania
- Cinematography: George Steel
- Editor: Paul Trejo
- Running time: 84–86 minutes
- Production companies: Stephen David Entertainment; Stillking Films; A+E Studios

Original release
- Network: History Channel
- Release: January 25 – January 27, 2015

Sons of Liberty is an American television History Channel miniseries dramatizing the early American Revolution events in Boston, Massachusetts, the start of the Revolutionary War, and the negotiations of the Second Continental Congress which resulted in drafting and signing the 1776 United States Declaration of Independence in Philadelphia, Pennsylvania. The three-part miniseries premiered on January 25, 2015, directed by Kari Skogland. The theme music was composed by Hans Zimmer.

== Plot ==
The miniseries is set in the years 1765–1776, prior to start of the American Revolutionary War. It focuses on historical figures and pivotal events between the Thirteen Colonies and Great Britain, particularly the events that led to resistance to the crown and creation of the Sons of Liberty. The actions of the Sons of Liberty were the beginnings of the Continental Army, and these take place mostly around Boston in the Province of Massachusetts Bay.

Various American Revolutionary figures are protagonists in episodes, such as Samuel Adams, John Adams, Benjamin Franklin, John Hancock, Paul Revere, George Washington and the British General Thomas Gage. The episodes depict the creation of the Continental Congress, the Declaration of Independence and the outbreak of the Revolutionary War.

== Cast and characters ==
- Ben Barnes as Samuel "Sam" Adams
- Marton Csokas as General Thomas Gage
- Ryan Eggold as Dr. Joseph Warren
- Michael Raymond-James as Paul Revere
- Rafe Spall as John Hancock
- Henry Thomas as John Adams
- Jason O'Mara as George Washington
- Dean Norris as Benjamin Franklin
- Emily Berrington as Margaret Kemble Gage
- Sean Gilder as Thomas Hutchinson
- Kevin J. Ryan as John Pitcairn
- Shane Taylor as Captain Thomas Preston
- Jimmy Akingbola as Peter Salem
- John Voce as Ebenezer Richardson

== Episodes ==
No.	Title	Directed by	Written by	Original release date	U.S. viewers (millions)
1	"A Dangerous Game"	Kari Skogland	Kirk Ellis and Stephen David & David C. White	January 25, 2015	3.29
Still a group of colonies living under British oppression in 1765, local gangs fight each other over turf in the streets of Boston, much less thinking of starting a revolution. When tax collector and pub owner Sam Adams doesn't pay his own taxes, the Crown puts out a warrant for his arrest, leading to the destruction of Royal Governor Thomas Hutchinson's mansion. Wealthy businessman John Hancock, and Adams, establish a black-market smuggling operation and boycott all goods from Tory shops, identifying them with a "T" painted on their storefronts. But an altercation between a loyalist and a Colonist mob lead to a young boy's murder. Then, in 1770, after a conflict escalates with the Redcoats turn into a massacre, the wheels are put in motion to start a resistance against British tyranny.
2	"The Uprising"	Kari Skogland	Stephen David & David C. White	January 26, 2015	2.83
After the Colonists destroy 600,000 pounds of tea into the Boston Harbor in 1773, King George sends General Thomas Gage to Boston to remove Governor Hutchinson from office and restore balance. Sam, Hancock, and John Adams set off for Philadelphia to gather arms and support at the Pennsylvania State House, and meet the intense George Washington, a delegate from Virginia. Hancock financially supports Sam and his recruits to begin training their own rebel army on a rural farm outside the city. When the British catches wind of it, they order their capture, leading Paul Revere to set out on his famous ride to warn of the Redcoats coming into Lexington in 1775. Meanwhile, the newly formed Colonial militia clash with the British Army in the shot heard round the world.
3	"Independence"	Kari Skogland	Story by : Stephen David & David C. White and Kirk Ellis; Teleplay by : Stephen David & David C. White	January 27, 2015	3.30
The start of the American Revolution begins as the Redcoats and the Massachusetts militia continue to fight at the Battles of Lexington and Concord. Now that the battles develop into a full-blown war, Sam and Hancock enlist Ben Franklin to help them convince state delegates to support their cause for freedom. Meanwhile, General Gage charges Bunker Hill, causing the Patriots to suffer a major defeat. The loss inspires a document—the Declaration of Independence—written up by Thomas Jefferson, is signed by the Second Continental Congress on July 4, 1776. Colonists celebrate the evacuation of British troops in Boston. The newly formed Continental Army, led by General Washington will be put to the test when the Royal Navy's ships attack New York Harbor.

== Production ==
According to The Hollywood Reporter, production on Sons of Liberty began in the summer of 2014. The miniseries was also going to feature the minor story lines of Benedict Arnold and Patrick Henry.

== Release ==
The first teaser trailer was released on September 1, 2014, during Houdini, which incorrectly revealed a December 2014 release date and featured The Rolling Stones' "Paint It Black".

In Australia, Sons of Liberty aired on SBS One from February 5, 2015, as a six-part series.

In the United Kingdom, Sons of Liberty aired on History Channel from June 2, 2015, also as a six-part series.

=== Home media ===
Sons of Liberty was released on DVD and Blu-ray on May 26, 2015.

== Reception ==
=== Historical accuracy ===
The History Channel billed the series as a "dramatic interpretation of events" and a work of "historical fiction", arguing the goal of the miniseries was "to capture the spirit of the time, convey the personalities of the main characters, and focus on real events that have shaped our past". The series has attracted significant criticism for its historical inaccuracies and highly dramatic caricaturing of historical personalities.

== See also ==
- List of television series and miniseries about the American Revolution
- List of films about the American Revolution
