= American Colossus: The Triumph of Capitalism, 1865–1900 =

2010 nonfiction book by H. W. Brands

- Paperback edition cover
- Author: H. W. Brands
- Audio read by: Robertson Dean
- Subject: History
- Published: 2010
- Publisher: Doubleday
- Media type: Book; audiobook
- Pages: 624
- ISBN: 978-0385523332

American Colossus: The Triumph of Capitalism, 1865–1900 is a 2010 nonfiction book written by historian H. W. Brands. Published in print and as an audiobook, the book narrates thirty-five years of the history of the United States following the American Civil War. Brands's interpretation of the period emphasizes how the expansion of capitalism and ascent of businessmen transformed the country. This "triumph of capitalism", in Brands's words, markedly improved the quality of life in the United States but threatened to subvert the egalitarian principles of democracy.

Reviewers praised the book's pace and readability. American Colossus received criticism for its dependence on secondary sources and citation of outdated works and for occasionally choppy transitions to topics less connected to the central theme. The Christian Century and Publishers Weekly considered the book's topic fitting for its time of publication. AudioFile complimented the audiobook edition's narration, provided by Robertson Dean.

== Background ==
H. W. Brands, a professor at the University of Texas at Austin, was as of December 2006 a "prolific historian", in the words of the Boston Globe. He is the author of what The Austin Chronicle called a "string of popular books" about the history of the United States. Other works by Brands include A Traitor to His Class—a 2000 biography of Franklin D. Roosevelt that won the Pulitzer Prize—and the 2010 book American Dreams: The United States Since 1945. By 2010, Brands had written over a dozen books, and SFGate called him "comfortable writing for the general public". The June 15, 2010, edition of Library Journal reported that a new book by Brands, American Colossus: The Triumph of Capitalism, 1865–1900, was forthcoming and would be published in October of that year as a hardcover, ebook, and audiobook.

== Publication ==
Doubleday published American Colossus: The Triumph of Capitalism, 1865–1900 on October 12, 2010. On release, it sold for $35 USD (equivalent to $44 in 2025) and for $40 CAD (equivalent to $56 in 2025). The book is 624 pages long.

The audiobook version of American Colossus, twenty-three-and-a-half hours long and narrated by Robertson Dean, was also published in 2010, and it sold for $50 (equivalent to $74 in 2025) upon release. Released as a set of nineteen CDs, Random House Audio published the trade edition of the audiobook, and Books on Tape published the library edition.

In the spring of 2012, the Civil War Book Review reported that American Colossus was available in a paperback edition. On release, it sold for $17.95 (equivalent to $26 in 2025).

== Content ==
"Democracy is based on the principle of equality: you each have one vote. You can be rich, poor, educated, ignorant, whatever—you get one vote. Capitalism is based on inequality: people bring different talents to the economic marketplace, and they walk away with different returns. What happens when these two sets of values come into conflict?"

— H. W. Brands, 2011 interview

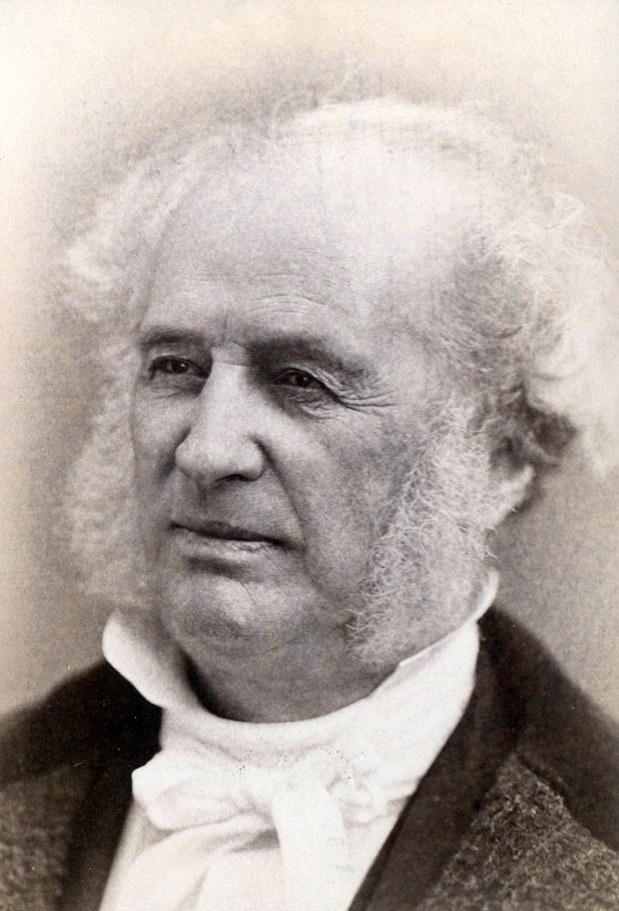
Cornelius
Vanderbilt

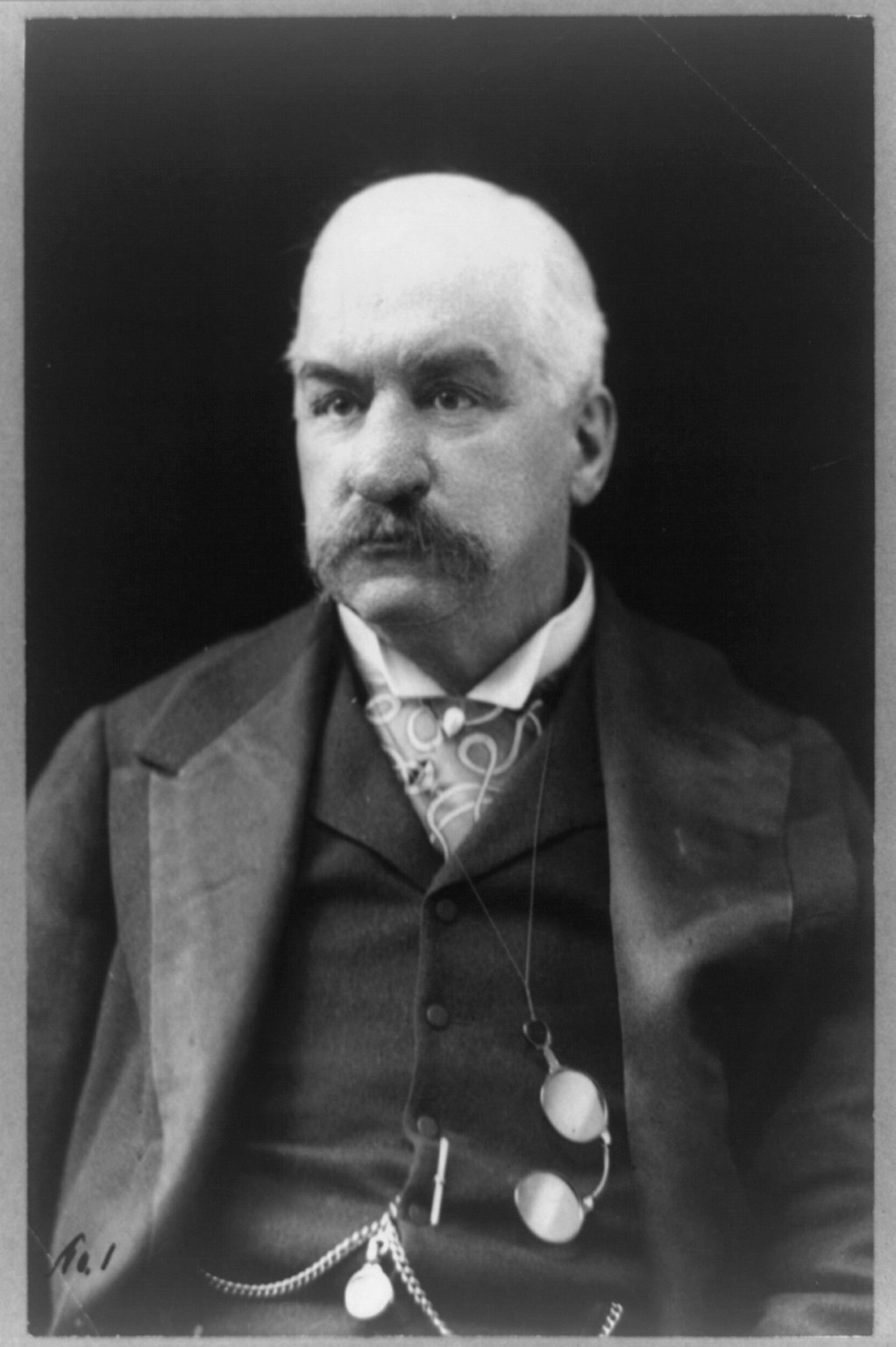
J. P.
Morgan

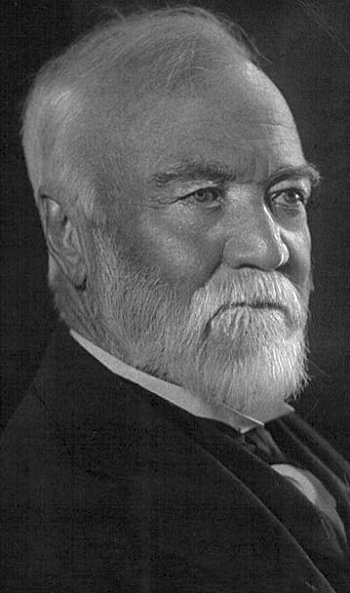
Andrew
Carnegie

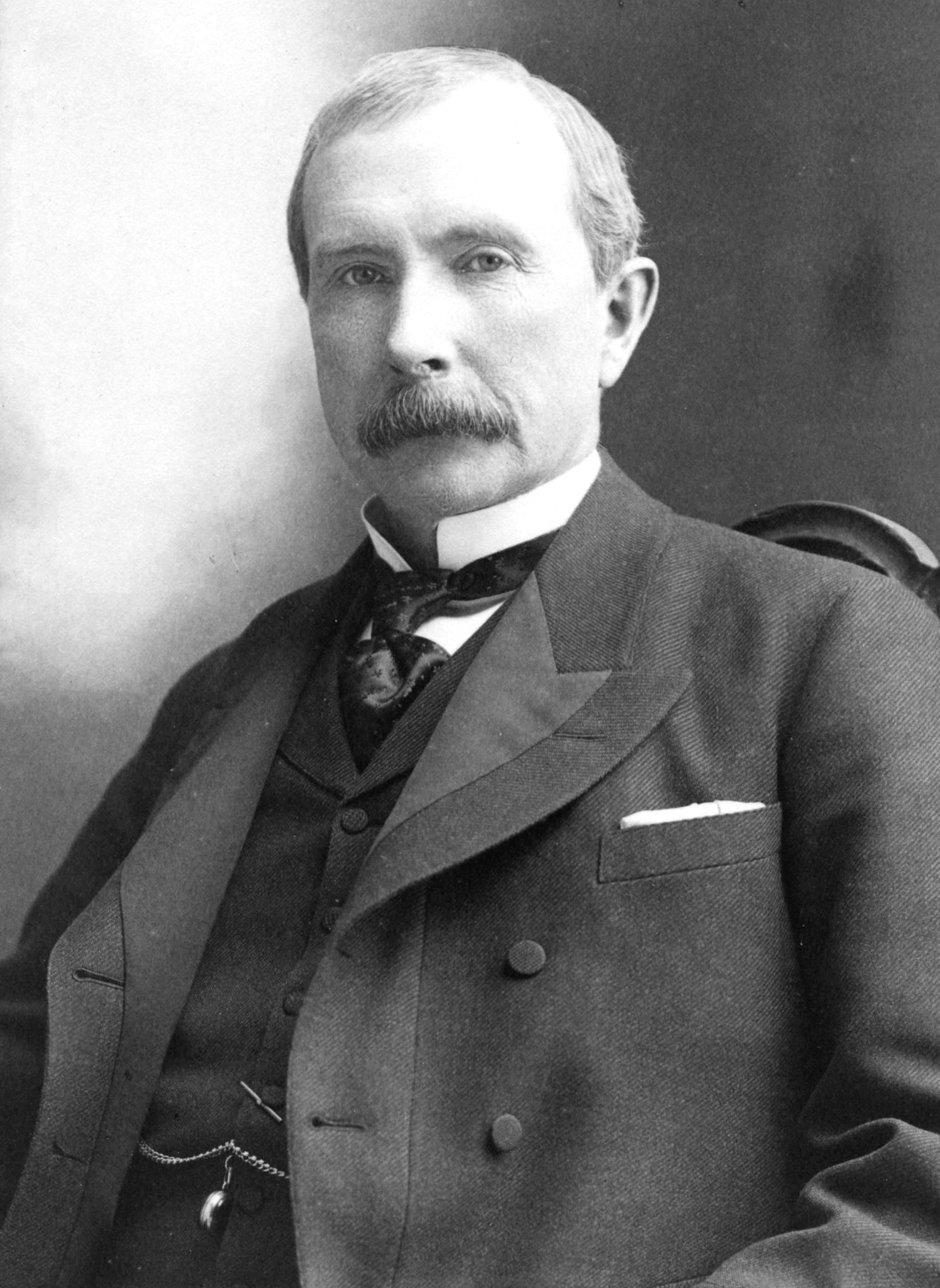
John D.
Rockefeller

American Colossus narrates United States history in the thirty-five years following the American Civil War. The book highlights the ascent of businessmen like Cornelius Vanderbilt, J. P. Morgan, John D. Rockefeller, and Andrew Carnegie, interpreting the time period through the lens of the "triumph of capitalism". From the perspective of material quality of life, Brands argues that "the capitalist revolution was in many ways the best thing ever to befall the ordinary people of America", as average income per capita doubled, and average life expectancy rose. The United States became the world's largest economy and gained infrastructural advancements like the Brooklyn Bridge and the transcontinental railroad. In the southern United States, wage laborers filled the gap left behind by abolished enslaved labor.

Politically, Brands argues in American Colossus that capitalism and democracy were at odds. Although the United States was "the world's archetype of capitalist democracy", in Brands's words, American Colossus portrays capitalism almost destroying American democracy. In an interview about the book, Brands explained his interpretation by saying that "democracy is based on the principle of equality: you each have one vote" whereas "capitalism is based on inequality: people bring different talents to the economic marketplace, and they walk away with different returns". Blue-collar workers were at a disadvantage in labor relations with business corporations, and American Colossus narrates several incidents of violence amid labor demonstrations, including the Pullman Strike and the Haymarket affair. Businessmen bribed politicians. The Supreme Court of the United States thwarted efforts to have the federal government check the power of business monopolies in the nineteenth century; anti-monopoly reform was more successful in the twentieth century, during the presidencies of Theodore Roosevelt and of Woodrow Wilson.

While narrating the rise of capitalism, American Colossus also provides a general survey of the period. Brands links capitalism to the decimation of Native Americans in the United States and the establishment of segregationist Jim Crow laws in the South. He tells the histories of westward settlement and waves of immigration.

American Colossus incorporates some firsthand accounts of the era, such as Black Elk's eyewitness account of the Wounded Knee Massacre and Jacob Riis's muckraker journalism. Mostly, it cites previously published scholarship, including multiple of Brands's earlier works.

== Reception ==
The Virginia Quarterly Review deemed American Colossus a "briskly paced, accessible book", and Kirkus Reviews dubbed it a "briskly written pseudo-textbook aimed at readers outside university classrooms". The Globe and Mail called it a "riveting narrative". According to the New York Times, American Colossus meets the difficulties of the period's breadth, summarizing that Brands "handles this sprawling, complicated story with authority and panache" and wrote "as close as serious history gets to a page turner". Salon called the book "a fast-paced tour through a fast-paced period" that "never bogs down" and features "some truly stunning views". A review in the Financial Post complimented the "storytelling and mastery of detail" and called the style "simple and vivid throughout". The Library Journal assessed American Colossus as a "solid contribution for undergraduates and other readers interested in the Gilded Age".

Kirkus Reviews criticized Brands's American Colossus for "rel[ying] too heavily on previous histories and biographies, including some of his own". According to the Virginia Quarterly, student readers of American Colossus "may be frustrated, for the book is neither a sharply defined reinterpretation nor a thorough synthesis of up-to-date scholarship". The New York Times averred that American Colossus's depiction of tycoon Cornelius Vanderbilt suffers because Brands cites older works about Vanderbilt. The Waterloo Region Record's review concluded that American Colossus has "good coverage of all the historical highlights, but the book doesn't offer a particularly fresh take".

American Colossus has many "fascinating detours", in the words of Publishers Weekly. In traversing his numerous topics, Brands "does not always provide smooth transitions", Kirkus Reviews reported. According to the Virginia Quarterly Review, some of American Colossus's digressions, "while required of a textbook survey of the era, seem less fundamental here" such that "some threads are only partly woven into" the book. Salon's book review argued that the book "is hampered by the sheer number of stories" and that "[t]oo often, Brands has the thousand anecdotes—but not the analysis".

"There's one really interesting, striking difference. I tell the story of how J. P. Morgan in 1895 came and personally bailed out the U. S. Treasury. There was a run on the gold in the Treasury's vault, and Morgan was the only one who could step in and keep the U. S. government from going bankrupt. Well, flash forward to 2008, and the roles reverse: it's the U. S. Treasury and the U. S. government that steps in to bail out JP Morgan and the big banks."

— H. W. Brands, 2011 interview

The Christian Century called American Colossus "a timely reminder" of how markets influence society. Publishers Weekly considered it a "timely study". In an interview conducted after the book was published, Brands reported that American Colossus's resonance with its time of publication surprised him, and he remarked on the difference between an American Colossus vignette in which financier J. P. Morgan bailed out the United States Department of the Treasury in 1895 compared to the then-contemporaneous Great Recession in which he said the United States government bailed out "JP Morgan and the big banks".

According to AudioFile, Robertson Dean's "skills are on full display" in the audiobook edition of American Colossus. AudioFile's review praised Dean's diction, averring that maintaining it was "no small feat" because of how long the American Colossus audiobook is, and wrote that "he makes every word interesting".
