= The Men Who Built America =

2012 American miniseries docudrama

- Region 1 DVD cover
- Genre: Biography; Docudrama
- Written by: Randy Counsman; Stephen David; Patrick Reams; David C. White; Alec Michod; Ed Fields; John Fahy; Keith Palmer
- Directed by: Patrick Reams, Ruán Magan
- Starring: David Donahoe; Matt Boliek; Adam Jonas Segaller; Cary Donaldson; John C. Bailey; Eric Rolland; Justin Morck
- Narrated by: Campbell Scott
- Theme music composer: "Save My Soul" by Blues Saraceno
- Original language: English
- No. of episodes: 8

Production
- Cinematography: Richard V. Lopez; Brian O'Carroll
- Editors: Tim W. Kelly; Jonathan Soule; Beatrice Sisul; Tina Pacheco; John Kilgour; Sheri Bylander
- Production company: Stephen David Entertainment

Original release
- Network: History Channel
- Release: October 16 – November 11, 2012

Related
- The Men Who Built America: Frontiersmen; The Titans That Built America

The Men Who Built America (also known as The Innovators: The Men Who Built America in some international markets) is an eight-part miniseries docudrama by the History Channel. It is the first installment of the That Built franchise.

== Overview ==
The series focuses on the lives of Cornelius Vanderbilt, John D. Rockefeller, Andrew Carnegie, J. P. Morgan, and Henry Ford. It tells how their industrial innovations and business empires revolutionized modern society. The series is directed by Patrick Reams and Ruán Magan and is narrated by Campbell Scott. It averaged 2.6 million total viewers (1.2 million adults 25–54 and 1 million adults 18–49) across four nights.

== Cast ==
Additional narration was provided by H. W. Brands, Mark Cuban, Donny Deutsch, Donald Trump, Jim Cramer, and Steve Case.

- William Jennings Bryan – James Kidd
- Andrew Carnegie – (The Elder) – Adam Jonas Segaller
  - Andrew Carnegie – (The Younger) – AJ Achinger
- Thomas Edison – Justin Morck
- James Fisk – Kenneth Cavett
- Henry Ford – Cary Donaldson
- Henry Clay Frick – John C. Bailey
- Jay Gould – Cameron McNary
- William McKinley – Dan Odell
- J. P. Morgan – (The Elder) – Ray Reynolds
  - J. P. Morgan – (The Younger) – Eric Rolland
- Junius Spencer Morgan – Daniel Berkey
- John D. Rockefeller – Tim Getman
- Theodore Roosevelt – Joseph Wiegand
- Charles M. Schwab – John Keabler
- Thomas A. Scott – Don Meehan
- Nikola Tesla – Alex Falberg
- Cornelius Vanderbilt – David Donahoe
- William Henry Vanderbilt – Michael Chmiel
- George Westinghouse – Einar Gunn
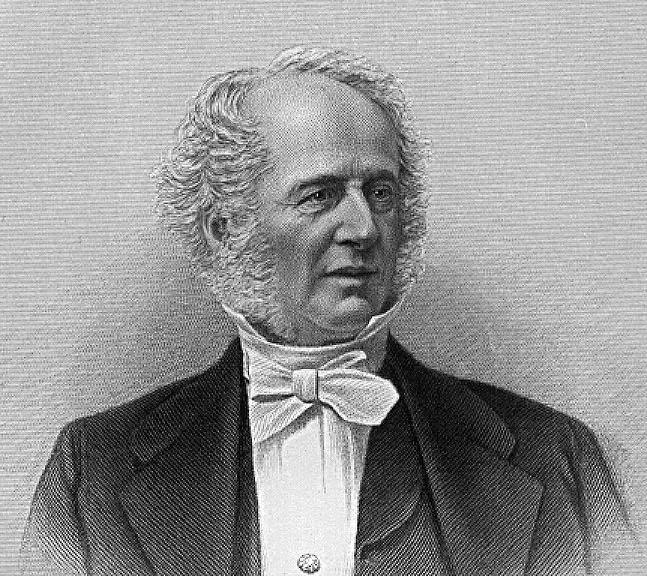
Cornelius Vanderbilt

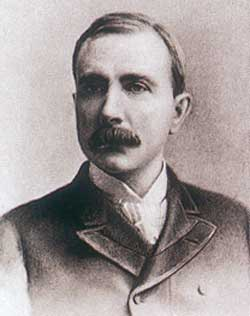
John D. Rockefeller

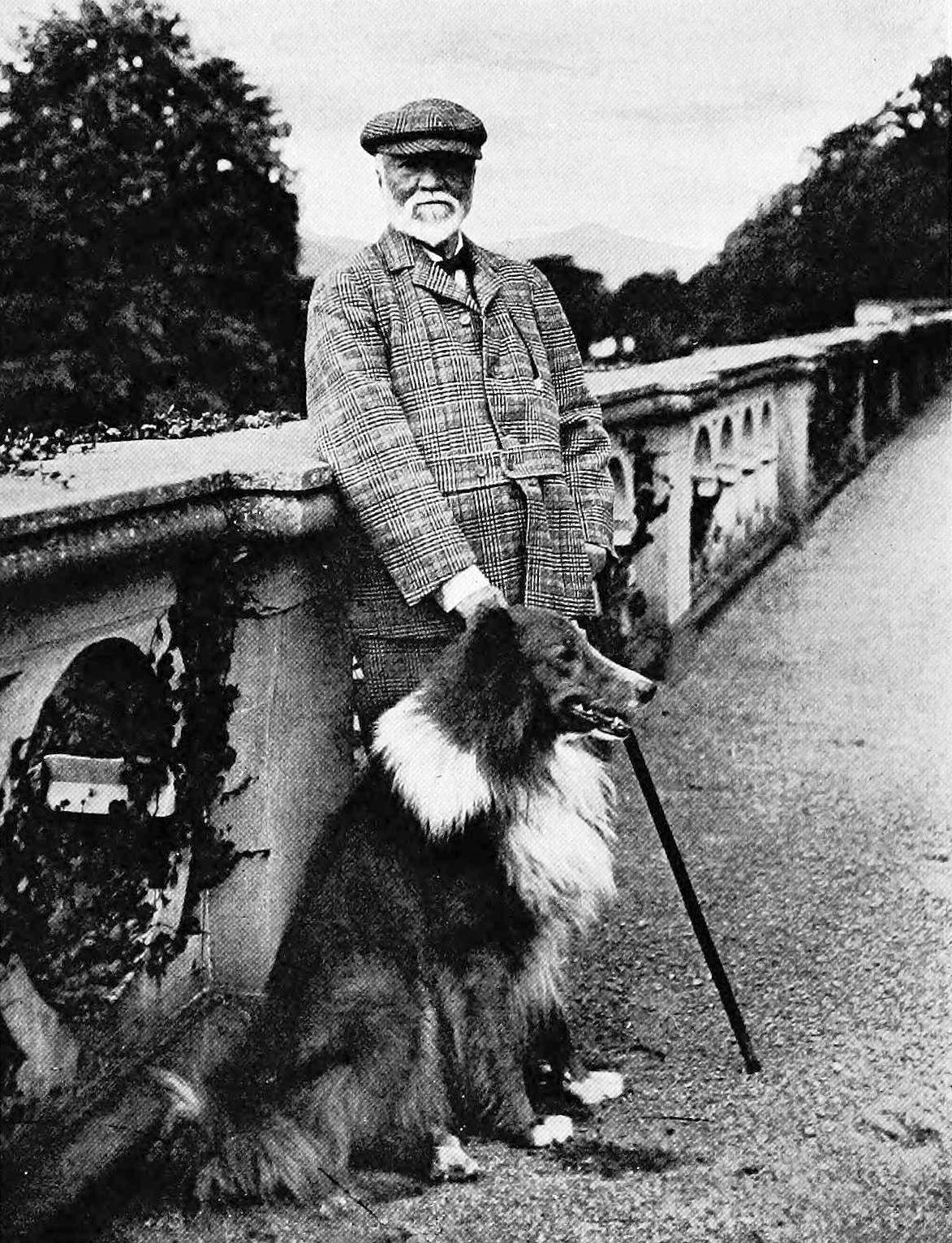
Andrew Carnegie

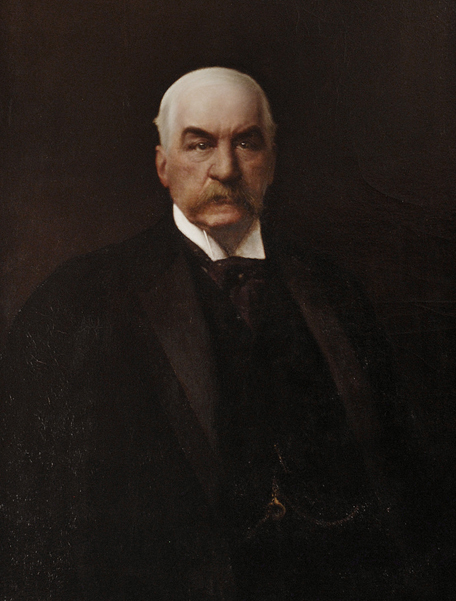
J. P. Morgan

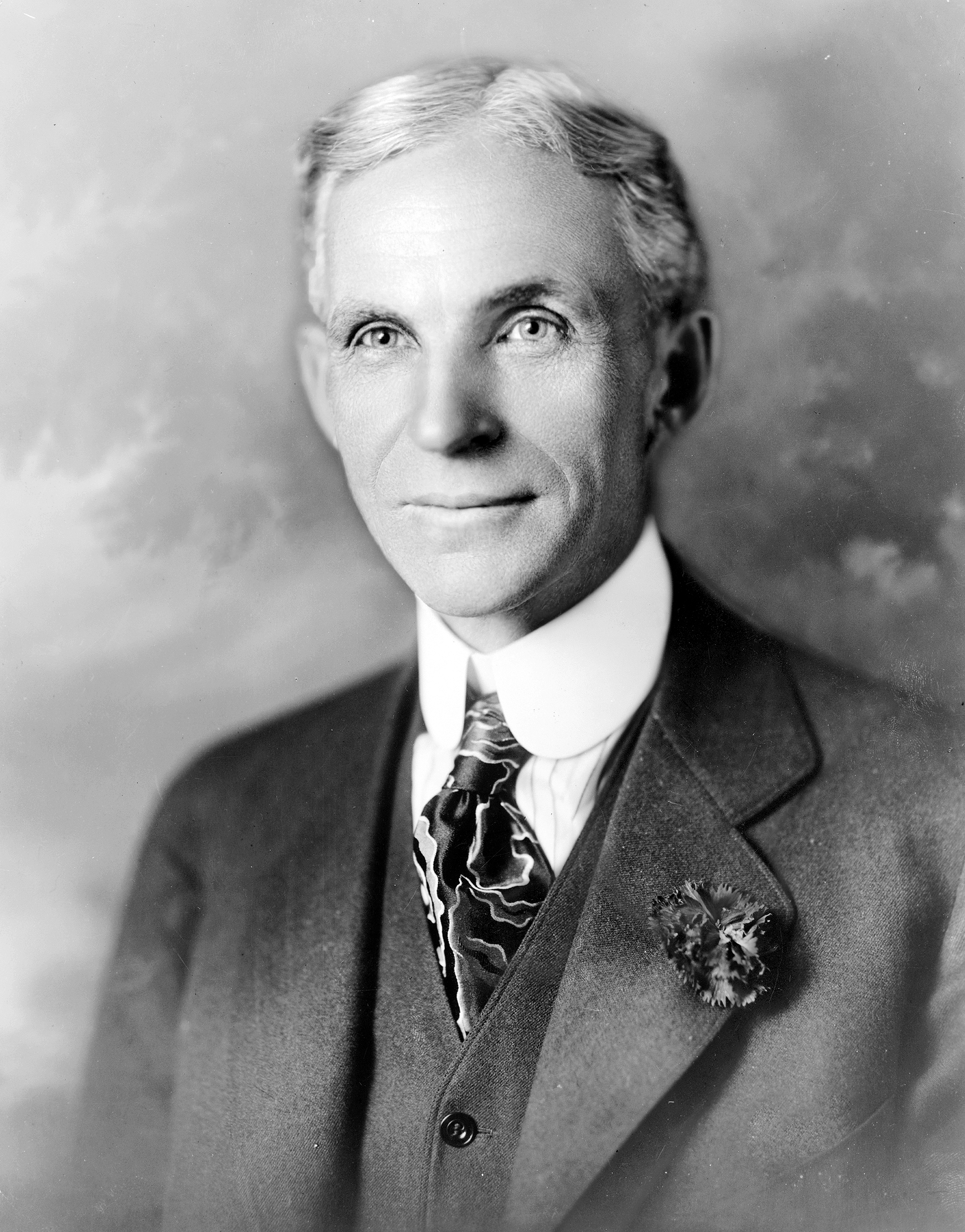
Henry Ford

== Episodes ==
Eight individual episodes were produced for the series; however, for the program's initial broadcast on History Channel, they were combined into four episodes.

No.	Title	Omnibus broadcast title	Directed by	Written by	Original release date
1	"A New War Begins"	A New War Begins	Ruán Magan	David C. White, Keith Palmer	October 16, 2012
2	"Oil Strike"	A New War Begins	Ruán Magan	David C. White, Keith Palmer	October 16, 2012
Cornelius Vanderbilt grows from a steamboat entrepreneur to the head of a railroad empire, and gets into a heated rivalry with James Fisk and Jay Gould; the up and coming John D. Rockefeller founds Standard Oil. Many business owners lay their own rail lines which leads to the Panic of 1873. Later, Rockefeller starts to expand his wealth by diverting his business from the railroads to a new innovation, oil pipelines.
3	"A Rivalry Is Born"	Bloody Battles	Patrick Reams	David C. White, Keith Palmer	October 23, 2012
4	"Blood Is Spilled"	Bloody Battles	Patrick Reams	David C. White, Keith Palmer	October 23, 2012
Andrew Carnegie builds an empire around steel, but finds himself struggling to save face after the ruthless tactics of his business partner, Henry Clay Frick, result in both the Johnstown Flood as well as the bloody 1892 strike at the Homestead Steel Works.
5	"A New Rival Emerges"	Changing the Game	Patrick Reams	David C. White, Patrick Reams, Keith Palmer	October 30, 2012
6	"Owning It All"	Changing the Game	Patrick Reams	David C. White, Patrick Reams, Keith Palmer	October 30, 2012
J. P. Morgan proceeds to banish the dark with the direct current electric light of Thomas Edison, but the two soon face serious competition from the alternating current of George Westinghouse and Nikola Tesla. As the 19th century comes to a close, the titans of industry must try to work together to stop a new threat in budding politician William Jennings Bryan, who threatens to dissolve monopolies in America.
7	"Taking The White House"	When One Ends, Another Begins	Patrick Reams	David C. White, Keith Palmer	November 11, 2012
8	"The New Machine"	When One Ends, Another Begins	Patrick Reams	David C. White, Keith Palmer	November 11, 2012
Rockefeller, Carnegie and Morgan team up to help elect William McKinley to the U.S. presidency by paying for his 1896 campaign, to avoid a possible attack on monopolies. However, fate intervenes when McKinley is suddenly assassinated, and Vice President Theodore Roosevelt assumes the presidency and promptly begins dissolving monopolies and trusts in America. Meanwhile, Morgan buys out Carnegie Steel to make Carnegie the richest man in the world, and Henry Ford designs an affordable automobile with his Model T and starts his own business, Ford Motor Company, which sets a new business model for companies to follow.

== Release ==
It was originally broadcast on the History Channel in autumn 2012, and on the History Channel UK in fall 2013.

== Reception ==
=== Critical response ===
On the review aggregator website Rotten Tomatoes, 62% of 13 critics' reviews are positive. On Metacritic the series has a score of 60 out of 100, based on 4 critics, indicating "mixed or average reviews".

Neil Genzlinger from The New York Times observed that the series did not contain startling revelations about its principal subjects, although certainly gave them a modern-day relevance. Linda Holmes writing for NPR ridiculed the series for dull presentation, corny re-enactments and ineffective narration. She criticized the production for feeling "a lot like a tricked-out version of an elementary school filmstrip" and suggested that the series might be popular among those who accepted Donald Trump as one of the experts.

Geoff Berkshire from Variety criticized the series for "overblown recreations backed by bombastic music, combined with tepid performances by the re-enactors and rudimentary writing". Mentioning the series' "ostentatious style [that] begins to grate within the first 30 minutes", he scorned "the talking heads [that] simply feel like filler" and the particular style of padding out the runtime when "the viewers are subjected to the customary recap of the previous segment after every ad break." He concluded that unlike the game-changing icons it intended to celebrate, the series failed to leave its mark. Verne Gay from Newsday gave the series "C" grade for "self-serving, obvious or of the fortune cookie variety" tips dispensed by the guests and for the lack of subtlety and historic context. On another hand, he praised the well-produced, although often static, recreations.

== Home media ==
The miniseries has been released by The History Channel on January 22, 2013, in a three-disc set in both DVD and Blu-ray Disc formats.
