= Foreign policy of the Lyndon B. Johnson administration =

Foreign of policy of the lyndon b. johnson administration

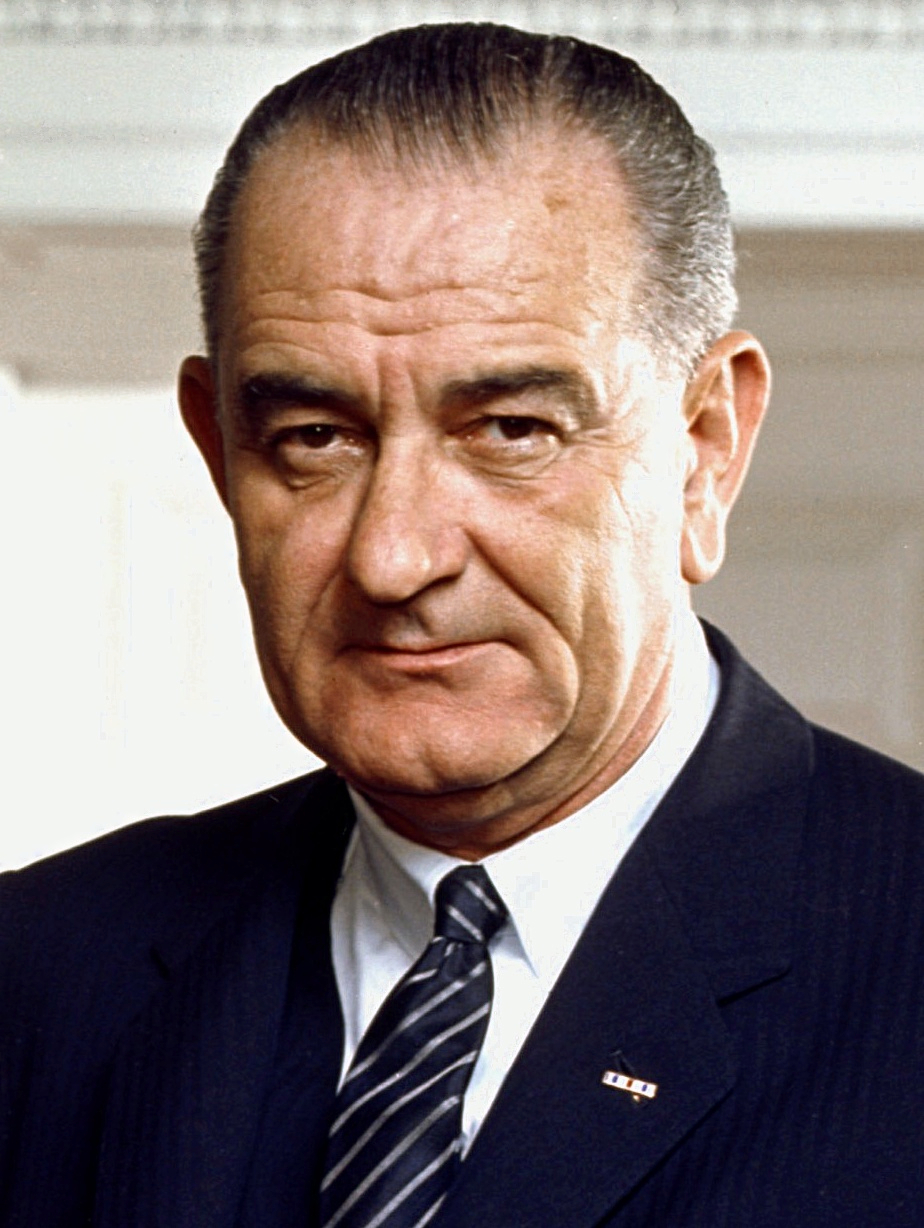
President Lyndon B. Johnson directed U.S. foreign policy from 1963 to 1969

The United States foreign policy during the 1963-1969 presidency of Lyndon B. Johnson was dominated by the Vietnam War and the Cold War, a period of sustained geopolitical tension between the United States and the Soviet Union. Johnson took over after the Assassination of John F. Kennedy, while promising to keep Kennedy's policies and his team.

The U.S. had stationed advisory military personnel in South Vietnam since the 1950s, but Johnson presided over a major escalation of the U.S. role in the Vietnam War. After the 1964 Gulf of Tonkin incident, he obtained congressional approval to use military force to repel future attacks by North Vietnam. The number of U.S. soldiers increased from 16,700 soldiers when Johnson took office to over 500,000 in 1968, but North Vietnamese and Viet Cong forces continued fighting despite losses. Domestic resistance to the war grew throughout Johnson's presidency, and especially after the 1968 Tet Offensive. Johnson was unsuccessful in his efforts to reach a peace agreement during his final days in office, and the war continued.

Johnson pursued conciliatory policies with the Soviet Union, but stopping well short of the détente policy Richard Nixon introduced in the 1970s. He was instead committed to the traditional policy of containment, seeking to stop the spread of Communism in Southeast Asia and elsewhere. He continued Kennedy's Alliance for Progress policies in Latin America and successfully pressured Israel to accept a cease fire in the Six-Day War.

== Policy making ==
=== Appointments ===
Johnson's 1967 foreign policy team

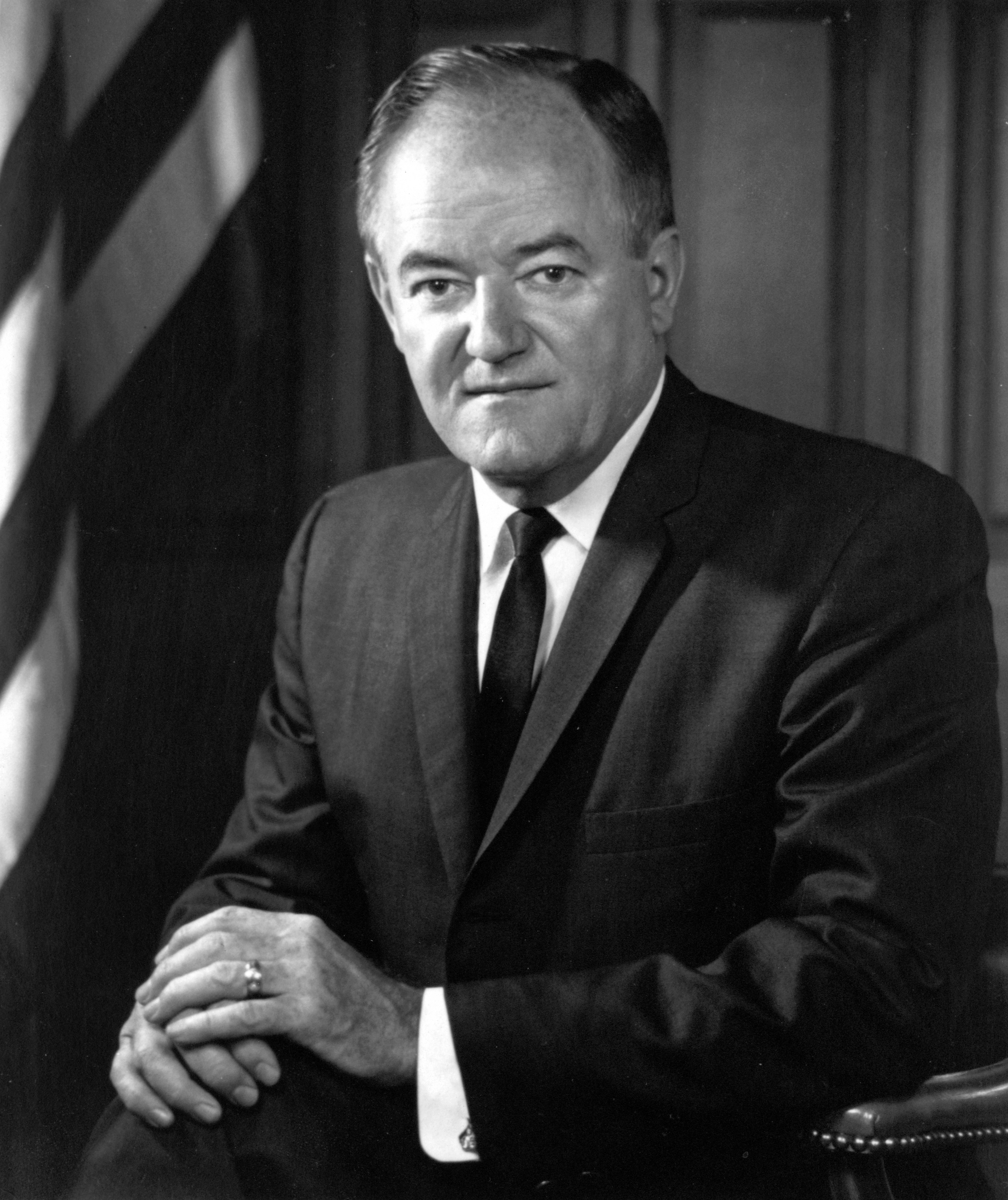
Hubert Humphrey

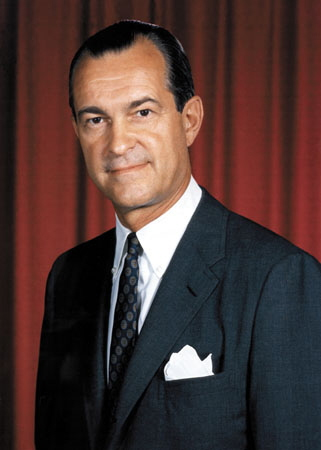
Richard Helms

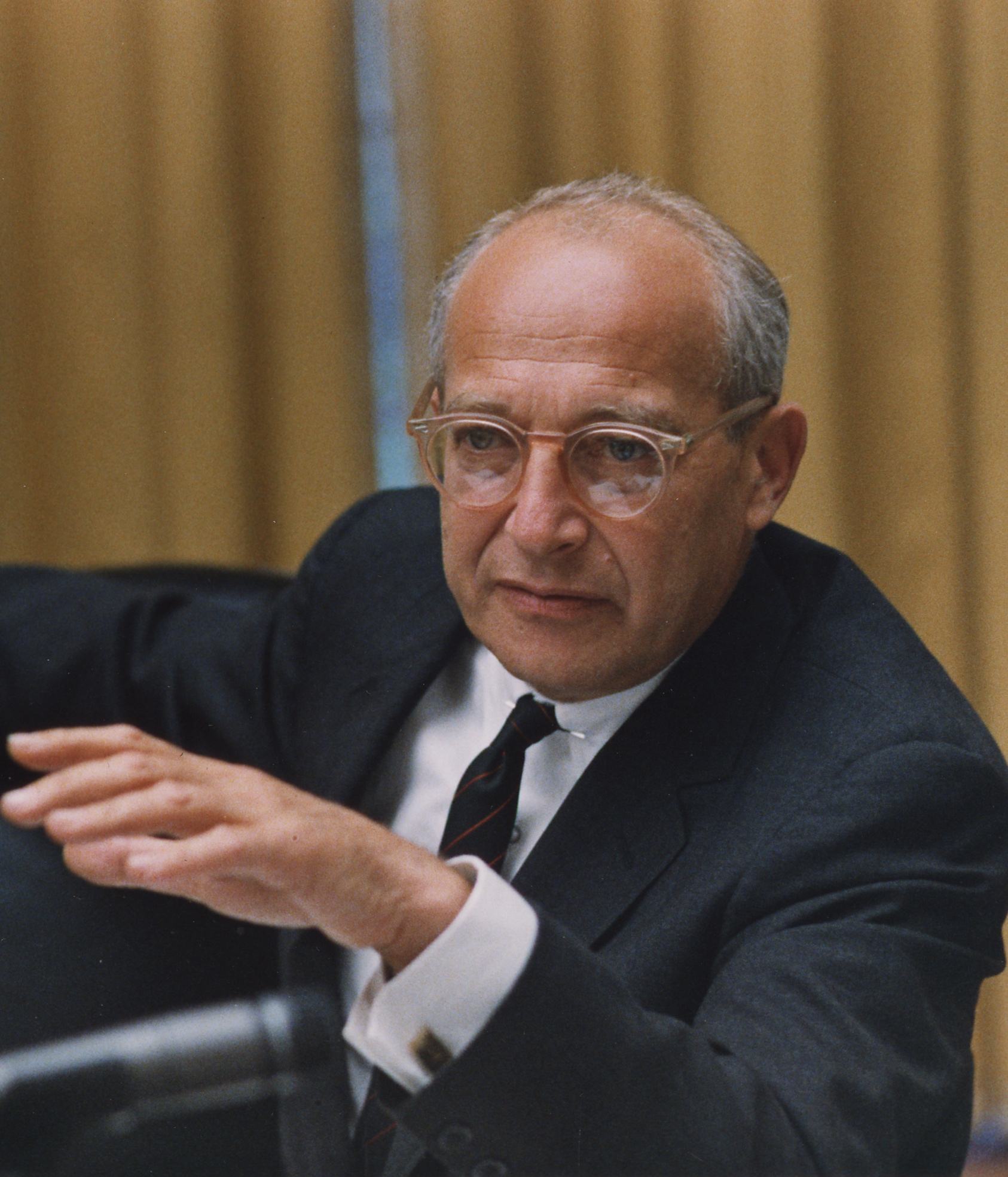
Walt Rostow

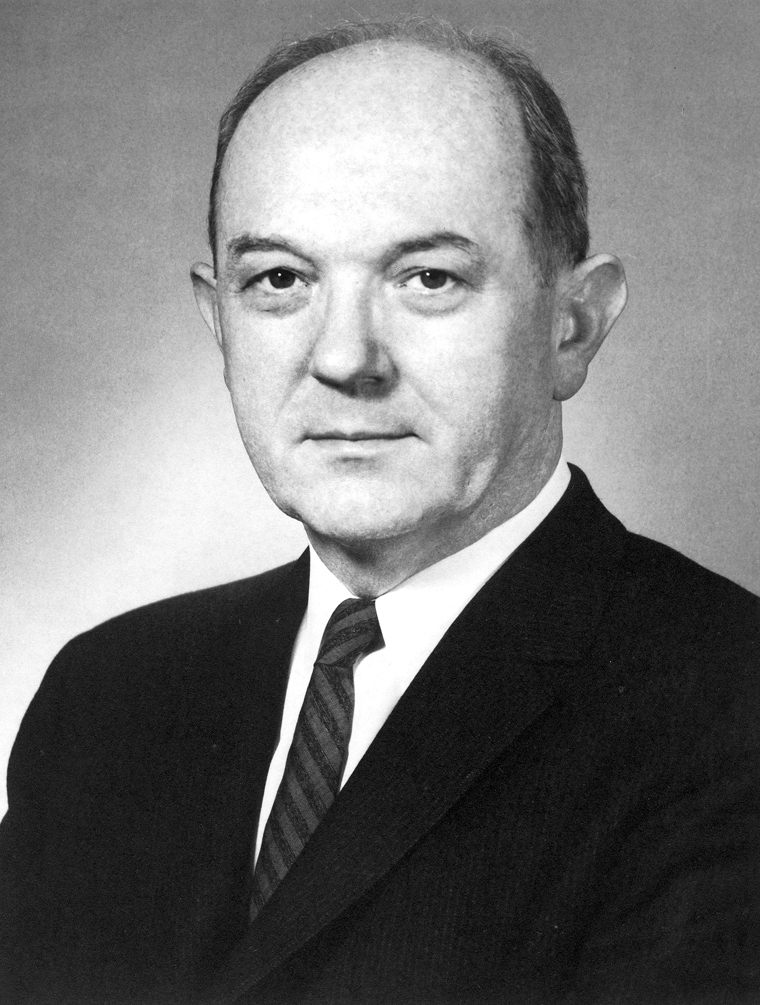
Dean Rusk

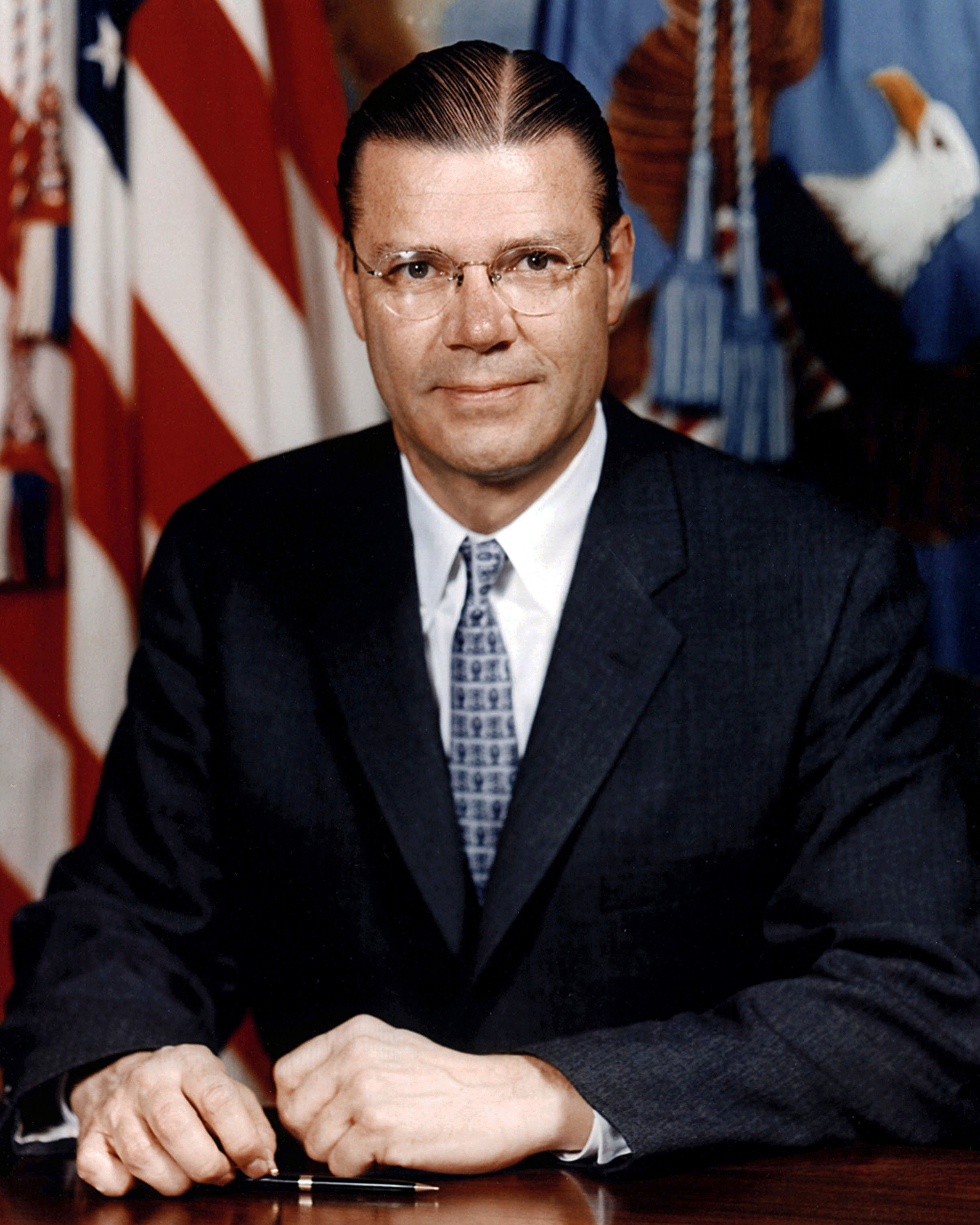
Robert McNamara

President Lyndon B. Johnson's key foreign policy advisors were Dean Rusk, George Ball, McGeorge Bundy, Walt Rostow, Robert McNamara and Clark Clifford. According to historian David Fromkin:

Johnson was not a "hidden hand" president like Eisenhower, who appeared to let his cabinet make policy while in fact doing so him self. L.B.J. was what he seemed at the time: a president ill at ease in foreign policy who chose to rely on the judgment of the Kennedy team he inherited....When his advisers disagreed, would try to split the difference between them. He acted as a majority leader, reconciling diverse points of view within his own camp rather than making decisions on the merits of the issue. He wanted to quell dissent, and he was a master at it.

All historians agree that Vietnam dominated the administration's foreign policy and all agree the policy was a political disaster on the home front. Most agree that it was a diplomatic disaster, although some say that it was successful in avoiding the loss of more allies. Unexpectedly, North Vietnam after it conquered the South became a major adversary of China, stopping China's expansion to the south in the way that Washington had hoped in vain that South Vietnam would do. In other areas the achievements were limited. Historian Jonathan Colman says that was because Vietnam dominated the attention; the USSR was gaining military parity; Washington's allies more becoming more independent (e.g. France) or were getting weaker (Britain); and the American economy was unable to meet Johnson's demands that it supply both guns and butter.

Former White House staff and historian, Doris Kearns Goodwin, wrote about Johnson feeling conflicted in his foreign policy. She recounts Johnson saying he would be "crucified" in any action he took, whether it being too hard or too soft on Communism. As a senator, he saw the political lessons after the establishment of the People's Republic of China in 1949. Johnson understood the pressure to not appear 'weak' in opposing Communism in Vietnam. There were ideas of masculinity and manhood among Johnson and his advisors that drove his foreign policy and the decision behind escalating the Vietnam War, which they were not confident they could win. There was the belief that the American public would forgive the President for anything, except for "being weak". This was important for managing America's post-colonial empire.

== Cold War ==
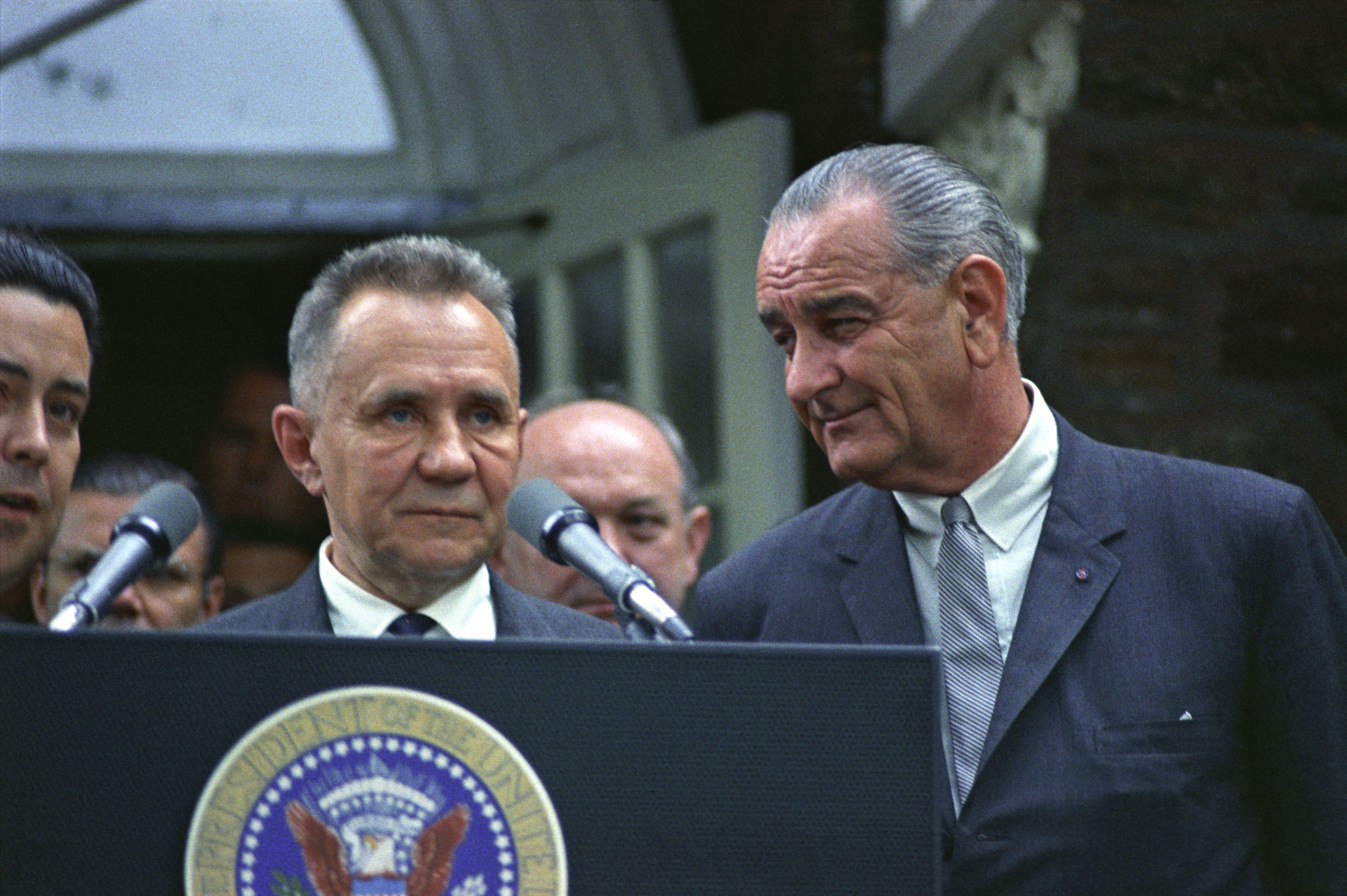
Soviet Premier Alexei Kosygin (left) next to Johnson during the Glassboro Summit Conference

Johnson took office during the Cold War, a prolonged state of very heavily armed tension between the United States and its allies on the one side and the Soviet Union and its allies on the other. Johnson was committed to containment policy that called upon the U.S. to block Communist expansion of the sort that was taking place in Vietnam, but he lacked Kennedy's knowledge and enthusiasm for foreign policy, and prioritized domestic reforms over major initiatives in foreign affairs.

Though actively engaged in containment in Southeast Asia, the Middle East, and Latin America, Johnson made it a priority to seek arms control deals with Moscow. The Soviet Union also sought closer relations to the United States during the mid-to-late 1960s, partly due to the increasingly worse Sino-Soviet split.

The PRC developed nuclear weapons in 1964 and, as later declassified documents revealed, President Johnson considered preemptive attacks to halt its nuclear program. He ultimately decided the measure carried too much risk and it was abandoned. Instead, Johnson looked for ways to improve relations. The American public seemed more open to the idea of expanding contacts with China, such as relaxation of the trade embargo. However, the War in Vietnam was raging with China providing major aid to neighboring North Vietnam. Mao's Great Leap Forward had been a humiliating failure, and his Cultural Revolution was hostile to the U.S. In the end, Johnson made no move to change the standoff.

Johnson was concerned with averting the possibility of nuclear war, and he sought to reduce tensions in Europe. The Johnson administration pursued arms control agreements with the Soviet Union, signing the Outer Space Treaty and the Treaty on the Non-Proliferation of Nuclear Weapons, and laid the foundation for the Strategic Arms Limitation Talks. President Johnson held a largely amicable meeting with Soviet Premier Alexei Kosygin at the Glassboro Summit Conference in 1967; then, in July 1968 the United States, Britain, and the Soviet Union signed the Non-Proliferation Treaty, in which each signatory agreed not to help other countries develop or acquire nuclear weapons. A planned nuclear disarmament summit between the United States and the Soviet Union was scuttled after Soviet forces violently suppressed the Prague Spring, an attempted democratization of Czechoslovakia.

Sociologist Irving Louis Horowitz has explored the duality of roles between Johnson as the master domestic tactician and the misguided military tactician. Those character traits which made him excel at the one made him fail in the other. Three factors are involved: Johnson's idiosyncrasies, structural issues in the presidential role, and the contradictions inherent in the liberal Democratic coalition.

== Vietnam War ==
=== Background and Gulf of Tonkin Resolution ===
After World War II, Viet Minh revolutionaries under Indochinese Communist Party leader Ho Chi Minh sought to gain independence from the French Union in the First Indochina War. The 1954 Geneva Agreements had partitioned French Indochina into the Kingdom of Laos, the Kingdom of Cambodia, South Vietnam, and North Vietnam, the latter of which was controlled by the Communist Viet Minh. The Vietnam War began in 1955 as North Vietnamese forces, with the support of the Soviet Union, China, and other Communist governments, sought to reunify Vietnam by taking control of South Vietnam. Under President Dwight D. Eisenhower, who followed the containment policy of stopping the spread of Communism in Southeast Asia, the United States replaced France as the key patron of South Vietnam. Eisenhower and Kennedy both dispatched military advisers to South Vietnam. By the time Johnson took office in November 1963, there were 16,700 United States Armed Forces personnel in South Vietnam. Despite some misgivings, Johnson ultimately came to support escalation of the American role. He feared that the fall of Vietnam would hurt the Democratic Party's credibility on national security issues, and he also wanted to carry on what he saw as Kennedy's policies. Finally, like the vast majority of American political leaders in the mid-1960s, he was determined to prevent the spread of Communism.

In August 1964, allegations arose from the U.S. military that two U.S. Navy destroyers had been attacked by North Vietnamese Navy torpedo boats in international waters 40 miles (64 km) from the Vietnamese coast in the Gulf of Tonkin; naval communications and reports of the attack were contradictory. Even though President Johnson had very much wanted to keep discussions about Vietnam out of the 1964 election campaign, he felt compelled to respond to the supposed aggression by the Vietnamese. As a result, he sought and obtained from Congress the Gulf of Tonkin Resolution on August 7. The resolution gave congressional approval for use of military force by the commander-in-chief to repel future attacks and to assist members of SEATO requesting assistance. In July 1965, after the Gulf of Tonkin Resolution which authorised the use of military force in Southeast Asia, it was decided that the number of US troops in Vietnam will be raised from 75,000 to 125,000 men. The monthly draft doubled from 17,000 to 35,000. The president later in the campaign expressed assurance that the primary U.S. goal remained the preservation of South Vietnamese independence through material and advice, as opposed to any U.S. offensive posture.

=== 1965–1966 ===
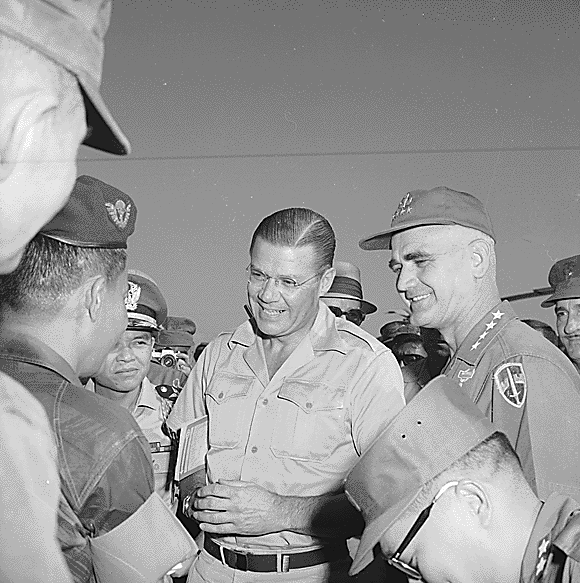
Secretary of Defense Robert McNamara and General Westmoreland in Vietnam 1965

Rejecting the advice of those who favored an immediate and dramatic escalation of the U.S. role in Vietnam, Johnson waited until early-1965 before authorizing a major bombing campaign of North Vietnam. The subsequent eight-week bombing campaign had little apparent effect on the overall course of the war. In a campaign known as Operation Rolling Thunder, the U.S. would continue to bomb North Vietnam until late-1968, dropping over 800,000 tons of bombs over three and a half years. This campaign took a gradual approach, attacking targets progressively. The North Vietnamese were able to realise which area would be targeted next and concentrated their air defences on these areas, using the "off limits" areas to keep their military forces safe. Operation Rolling Thunder In March, McGeorge Bundy began to urge the escalation of U.S. of ground forces, arguing that American air operations alone would not stop Hanoi's aggression against the South. Johnson responded by approving an increase in soldiers stationed in Vietnam and, most importantly, a change in mission from defensive to offensive operations. Even so, he defiantly continued to insist that this was not to be publicly represented as a change in existing policy.

In late-July, U.S. Defense Secretary Robert McNamara proposed to increase the number of U.S. soldiers in Vietnam from 75,000 to over 200,000 in order to convince North Vietnamese leader Ho Chi Minh to seek a negotiated peace. Bundy, Secretary of State Rusk, Ambassador Maxwell D. Taylor, General William Westmoreland and General Earle Wheeler, among others the president's key advisers on Vietnam, agreed with Secretary McNamara's recommendation. After consulting with his principals, Johnson, desirous of a low profile, chose to announce at a press conference an increase to 125,000 troops, with additional forces to be sent later upon request. Johnson privately described himself at the time as boxed in by unpalatable choices. If he sent additional troops he would be attacked as an interventionist, and if he did not, he thought he risked being impeached. Under the command of General Westmoreland, U.S. forces increasingly engaged in search and destroy operations against Communists operating in South Vietnam. By October 1965, there were over 200,000 troops deployed in Vietnam. Most of these soldiers were drafted after graduating from high school, and disproportionately came from economically disadvantaged backgrounds.

Throughout 1965, few members of the United States Congress or the administration openly criticized Johnson's handling of the war, though some, like George Ball, warned against expanding the U.S. presence in Vietnam. In early-1966, Robert F. Kennedy harshly criticized Johnson's bombing campaign, stating that the U.S. may be headed "on a road from which there is no turning back, a road that leads to catastrophe for all mankind." Soon thereafter, the U.S. Senate Foreign Relations Committee, chaired by Senator James William Fulbright, held televised hearings examining the administration's Vietnam policy. Impatience with the president and doubts about his war strategy continued to grow on Capitol Hill. In June 1966, Senator Richard Russell Jr., Chairman of the Senate Armed Services Committee, reflecting the coarsening of the national mood, declared it was time to "get it over or get out."

By late-1966, multiple sources began to report progress was being made against the North Vietnamese logistics and infrastructure; Johnson was urged from every corner to begin peace discussions. The gap with Hanoi, however, was an unbridgeable demand on both sides for a unilateral end to bombing and withdrawal of forces. Westmoreland and McNamara then recommended a concerted program to promote pacification; Johnson formally placed this effort under military control in October. During this time, Johnson grew more and more anxious about justifying war casualties, and talked of the need for decisive victory, despite the unpopularity of the cause. By late-1966, it was clear that the air campaign and the pacification effort had both been ineffectual, and Johnson agreed to McNamara's new recommendation to add 70,000 troops in 1967 to the 400,000 previously committed. Heeding the CIA's recommendations, Johnson also increased bombings against North Vietnam. The bombing escalation ended secret talks being held with North Vietnam, but U.S. leaders did not consider North Vietnamese intentions in those talks to be genuine.

=== 1967 and the Tet Offensive ===
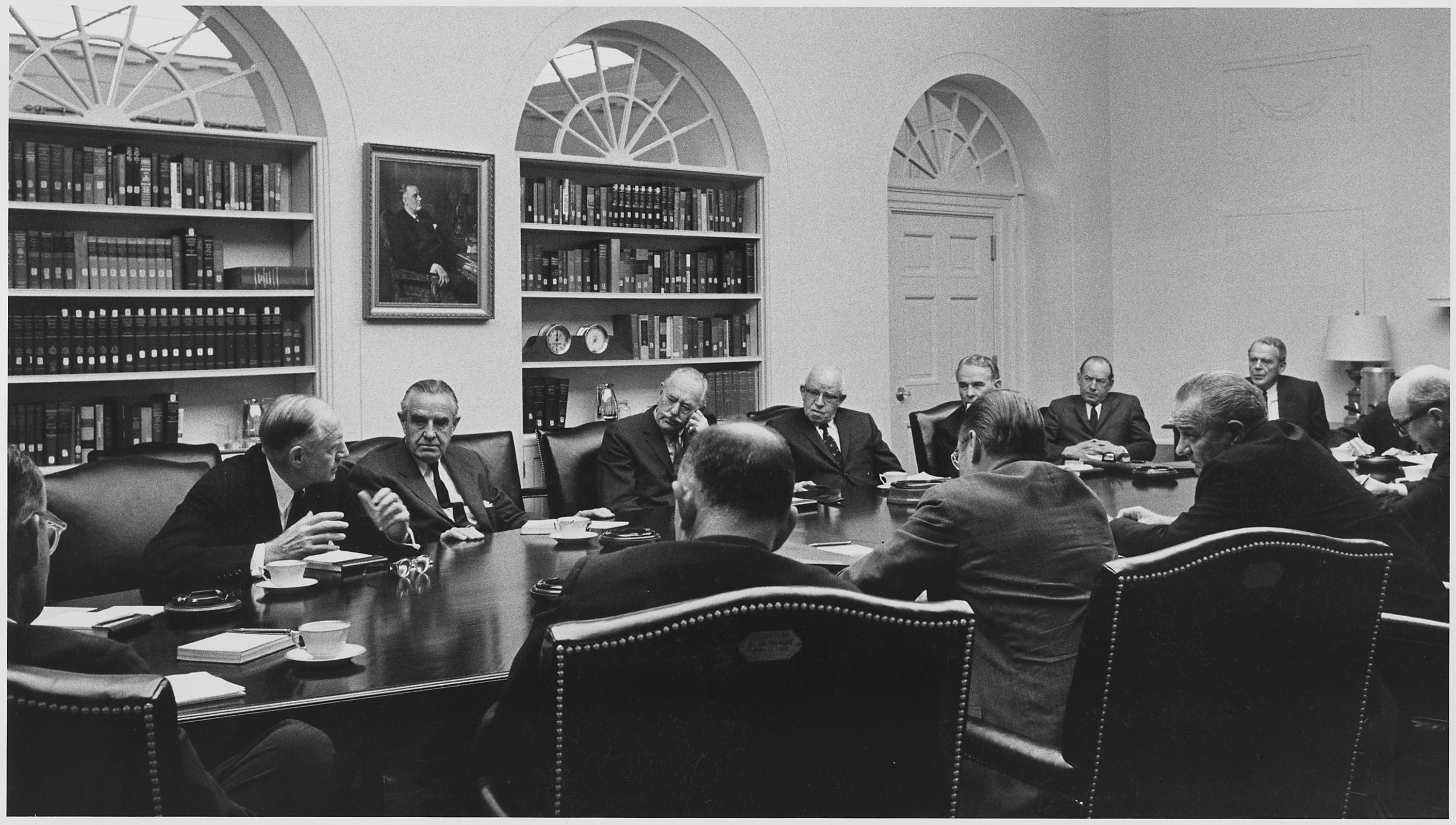
Johnson meets with a group of foreign policy advisors, collectively called "the Wise Men," discuss the Vietnam War effort.

By the middle of 1967 nearly 70,000 Americans had been killed or wounded in the war, which was being commonly described in the news media and elsewhere as a "stalemate." Nonetheless, Johnson agreed to an increase of 55,000 troops, bringing the total to 525,000. In August, Johnson, with the Joint Chiefs of Staff's support, decided to expand the air campaign and exempted only Hanoi, Haiphong and a buffer zone with China from the target list. Later that month McNamara told a United States Senate subcommittee that an expanded air campaign would not bring Hanoi to the peace table. The Joint Chiefs were astounded, and threatened mass resignation; McNamara was summoned to the White House for a three-hour dressing down; nevertheless, Johnson had received reports from the Central Intelligence Agency confirming McNamara's analysis at least in part. In the meantime an election establishing a constitutional government in the South was concluded and provided hope for peace talks.

With the war arguably in a stalemate and in light of the widespread disapproval of the conflict, Johnson convened a group of veteran government foreign policy experts, informally known as "the Wise Men": Dean Acheson, Gen. Omar Bradley, George Ball, McGeorge Bundy, Arthur Dean, C. Douglas Dillon, Abe Fortas, W. Averell Harriman, Henry Cabot Lodge Jr., Robert D. Murphy, and Maxwell D. Taylor. They unanimously opposed leaving Vietnam, and encouraged Johnson to "stay the course." Afterward, on November 17, in a nationally televised address, the president assured the American public, "We are inflicting greater losses than we're taking...We are making progress." Less than two weeks later, an emotional Robert McNamara announced his resignation as Secretary of Defense. Behind closed doors, he had begun regularly expressing doubts over Johnson's war strategy, angering the president. He joined a growing list of Johnson's top aides who resigned over the war, including Bill Moyers, McGeorge Bundy, and George Ball.

On January 30, 1968, the Viet Cong and the North Vietnamese Army began the Tet Offensive against South Vietnam's five largest cities. While the Tet offensive failed militarily, it was a psychological victory, definitively turning American public opinion against the war effort. In February 1968, influential news anchor Walter Cronkite expressed on the air that the conflict was "mired in a stalemate" and that additional fighting would change nothing. Johnson reacted, saying "If I've lost Cronkite, I've lost middle America". Indeed, demoralization about the war was everywhere; 26 percent then approved of Johnson's handling of Vietnam, while 63 percent disapproved.

=== Post-Tet Offensive ===
The Tet Offensive convinced senior leaders of the Johnson administration, including the "Wise Men" and new Defense Secretary Clark Clifford, that further escalation of troop levels would not help bring an end to the war. Johnson was initially reluctant to follow this advice, but ultimately agreed to allow a partial bombing halt and to signal his willingness to engage in peace talks. On March 31, 1968, Johnson announced that he would halt the bombing in North Vietnam, while at the same time announcing that he would not seek re-election. He also escalated U.S. military operations in South Vietnam in order to consolidate control of as much of the countryside as possible before the onset of serious peace talks. Talks began in Paris in May, but failed to yield any results. Two of the major obstacles in negotiations were the unwillingness of the United States to allow the Viet Cong to take part in the South Vietnamese government, and the unwillingness of North Vietnam to recognize the legitimacy of South Vietnam. In October 1968, when the parties came close to an agreement on a bombing halt, Republican presidential nominee Richard Nixon intervened with the South Vietnamese, promising better terms so as to delay a settlement on the issue until after the election. Johnson sought a continuation of talks after the 1968 United States elections, but the North Vietnamese argued about procedural matters until after Nixon took office.

Johnson once summed up his perspective of the Vietnam War as follows:

I knew from the start that I was bound to be crucified either way I moved. If I left the woman I really loved‍—‌the Great Society‍—‌in order to get involved in that bitch of a war on the other side of the world, then I would lose everything at home. All my programs.... But if I left that war and let the Communists take over South Vietnam, then I would be seen as a coward and my nation would be seen as an appeaser and we would both find it impossible to accomplish anything for anybody anywhere on the entire globe.

== Middle East: Six-Day War of 1967 ==
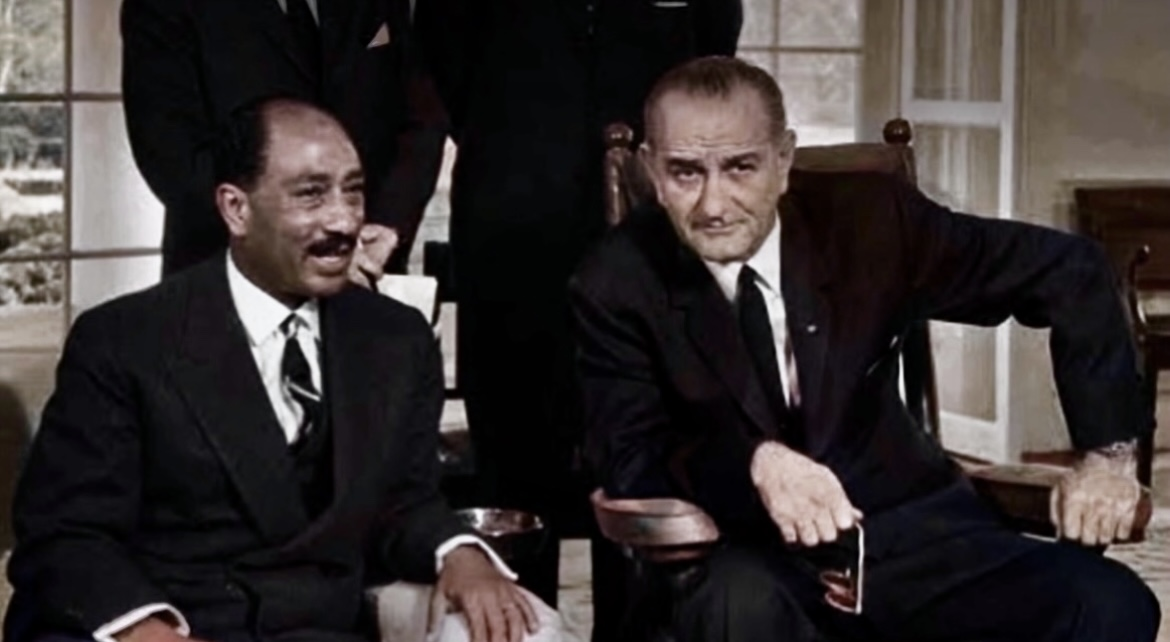
Johnson and Egypt Parliament Speaker Anwar Sadat in the White House, 1966

Johnson's Middle Eastern policy relied on the "three pillars" of Israel, Saudi Arabia, and Iran under the friendly Shah. High priorities were to minimize Soviet influence, guarantee the flow of oil to the U.S., and protecting Israel and solidifying support from the American Jewish community.

In the mid-1960s, concerns about the Israeli nuclear weapons program led to increasing tension between Israel and neighboring Arab states, especially Egypt. At the same time, the Palestine Liberation Organization launched terrorist attacks against Israel from bases in the West Bank and the Golan Heights. The Johnson administration attempted to mediate the conflict, but communicated through Fortas and others that it would not oppose Israeli military action. On June 5, 1967, Israel launched an attack on Egypt, Syria, and Jordan, beginning the Six-Day War. Israel quickly seized control of the Gaza Strip, the West Bank, East Jerusalem, and the Sinai Peninsula. As Israeli forces closed in on the Syrian capital of Damascus, the Soviet Union threatened war if Israel did not agree to a cease fire. Johnson successfully pressured the Israeli government into accepting a cease fire, and the war ended on June 11. To avoid escalating the Mideast conflict, Johnson negotiated with Moscow to find a peaceful settlement. The result was UN Security Council resolution 242, which became the basic American policy. However, frustration followed as the arms race in the Mideast continued, Israel refused to withdraw from some areas, and the Arabs refused to negotiate directly with Israel.

In November 1968 Johnson agreed to sell 50 F-4 Phantom II aircraft to Israel, together with munitions, parts, maintenance equipment and requisite mechanical and pilot training. Johnson hoped his actions would strengthen Jewish support at home for his war in Vietnam.

On June 8, 1967, Israeli Air Force war planes and Israeli Navy torpedo boats attacked a US Navy electronics intelligence ship monitoring the ongoing Six Day War. The casualty toll was 34 Americans killed and 171 Americans wounded in what became known as the USS Liberty incident. American and Israeli government investigations both concluded that the attack occurred due to Israeli error, though others disagree. Israel issued an official apology and financial compensation.

== Latin America ==
Under the direction of Assistant Secretary of State Thomas C. Mann, Washington continued Kennedy's emphasis on the Alliance for Progress, which provided economic aid to speed up economic modernization in Latin America. Like Kennedy, Johnson sought to isolate Cuba, which was under the rule of the Soviet-aligned Fidel Castro. In 1964 Johnson pressured the Organisation of American States into imposing a commercial and diplomatic embargo against Cuba, this continued through to the mid-1970s.

In 1965, the Dominican Civil War broke out between the government of President Donald Reid Cabral and supporters of former President Juan Bosch. On the advice of Abe Fortas, Johnson dispatched over 20,000 United States Marine Corps troops to the Dominican Republic. Their role was not to take sides but to evacuate American citizens and restore order. The U.S. also helped arrange an agreement providing for new elections. Johnson's use of force in ending the civil war alienated many in Latin America, and the region's importance to the administration receded as Johnson's foreign policy became increasingly dominated by the Vietnam War.

== Western Europe ==
=== United Kingdom ===
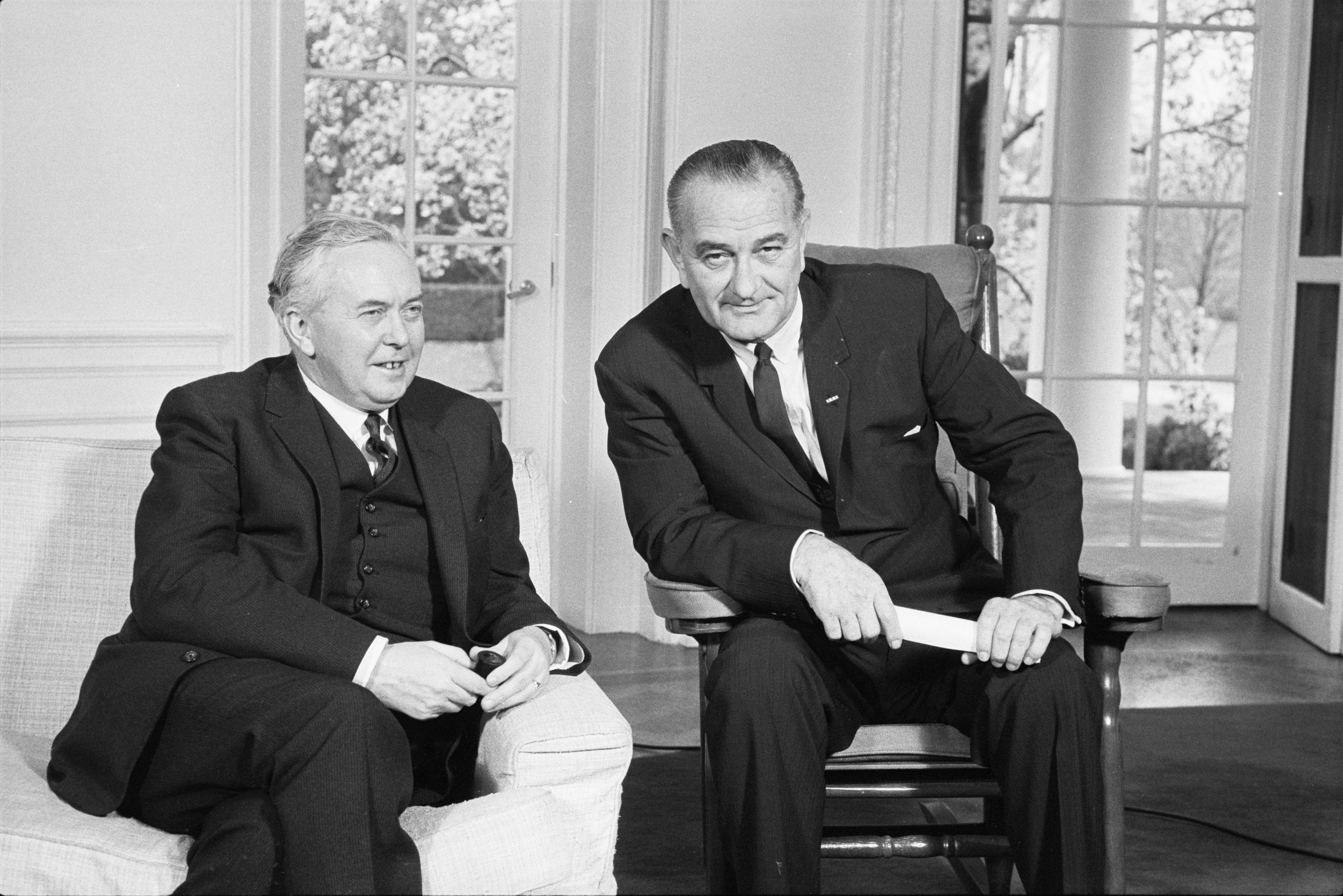
Johnson with British Prime Minister Harold Wilson in 1965

Harold Wilson, the British Prime Minister from 1964 to 1970, believed in a strong "Special Relationship" with the United States and wanted to highlight his dealings with the White House to strengthen his own prestige as a statesman. President Johnson disliked Wilson and ignored any "special" relationship. However, when Johnson needed and asked for help to maintain American prestige, Wilson offered only lukewarm verbal support for the Vietnam War. Wilson and Johnson also differed sharply on British economic weakness and its declining status as a world power. Historian Jonathan Colman concludes it made for the most unsatisfactory "special" relationship in the 20th century.

The tone of the relationship was set early on when Johnson sent Secretary of State Dean Rusk as head of the American delegation to the state funeral of Winston Churchill in January 1965, rather than the new vice president, Hubert Humphrey. Johnson himself had been hospitalized with influenza and advised by his doctors against attending the funeral. This perceived slight generated much criticism against the president, both in the U.K. and in the U.S.

=== France ===
As the economies of Western Europe recovered, European leaders increasingly sought to recast the alliance as a partnership of equals. This trend, and his escalation of the Vietnam War, led to tensions within NATO. Johnson's request that NATO leaders send even token forces to South Vietnam were denied by leaders who lacked a strategic interest in the region. West Germany was torn between France and the United States. France pursued independent foreign policies, and in 1966 its President Charles de Gaulle withdrew France from some NATO roles. The withdrawal of France, along with West German and British defense cuts, substantially weakened NATO, but the alliance remained intact. Johnson refrained from criticizing de Gaulle and he resisted calls to reduce American troop levels on the continent.

== South Asia ==
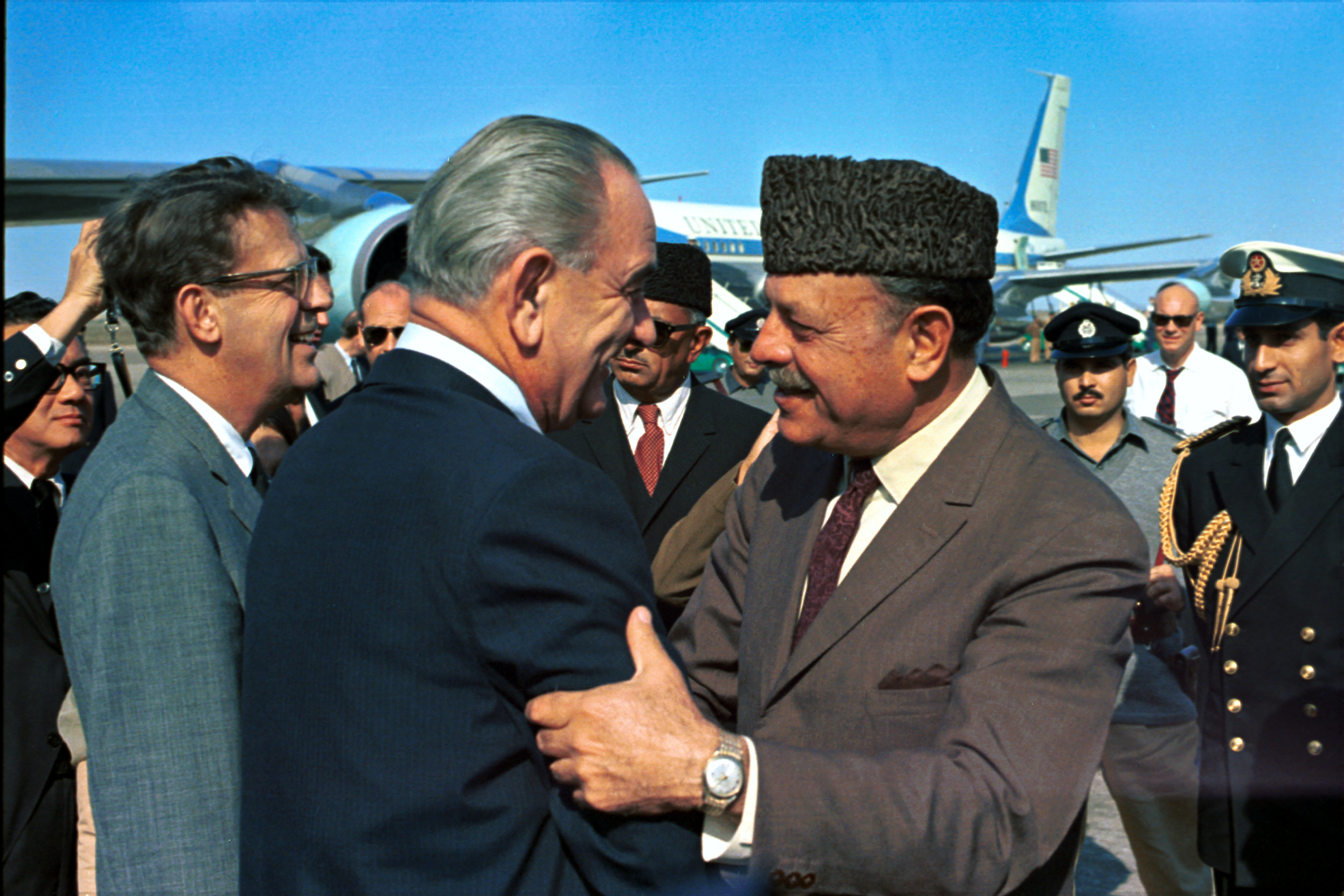
Johnson meeting with President of Pakistan Ayub Khan.

Since 1954, the American alliance with Pakistan had caused neutral India to move closer to the Soviet Union. Johnson hoped that a more evenhanded policy towards both countries would soften the tensions in South Asia and bring both nations closer to the United States. He ended the traditional American division of South Asia into 'allies' and 'neutrals' and sought to develop good relations with both India and Pakistan by supplying arms and money to both while maintaining neutrality in their intense border feuds. His policy pushed Pakistan closer to Communist China and India closer to the Soviet Union. Johnson also started to cultivate warm personal relations with Prime Minister Lal Bahadur Shastri of India and President Ayub Khan of Pakistan. However, he inflamed anti-American sentiments in both countries when he cancelled the visits of both leaders to Washington.

== List of international trips ==
Johnson made eleven international trips to twenty countries during his presidency. He flew 523,000 miles aboard Air Force One while in office. One of the most unusual international trips in presidential history occurred before Christmas in 1967. The President began the trip by going to the memorial service for Australian Prime Minister Harold Holt, who had disappeared in a swimming accident and was presumed drowned. The White House did not reveal in advance to the press that the President would make the first round-the-world presidential trip. The trip was 26,959 miles completed in only 112.5 hours (4.7 days). Air Force One crossed the equator twice, stopped in Travis Air Force Base, California, then Honolulu, Pago Pago, Canberra, Melbourne, South Vietnam, Karachi and Rome.

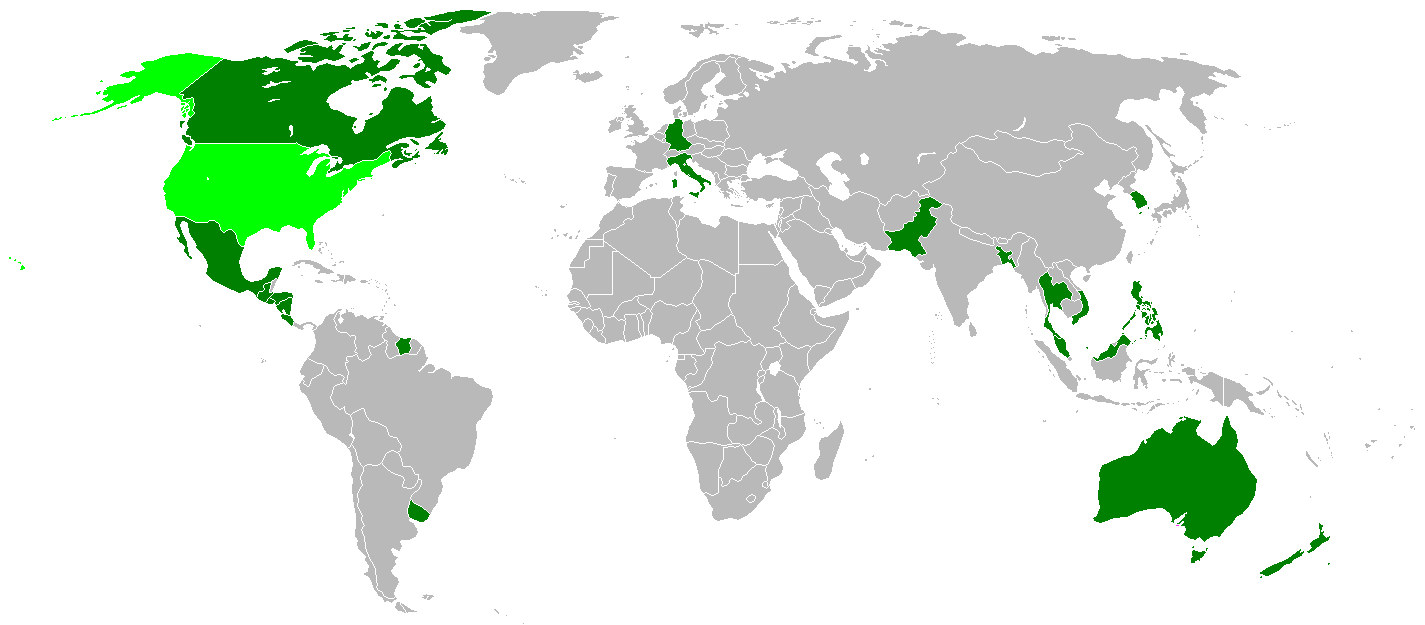
Countries visited by Johnson during his presidency.

| | Dates | Country | Locations | Details |
|---|---|---|---|---|
| 1 | September 16, 1964 | Canada | Vancouver | Informal visit. Met with Prime Minister Lester B. Pearson in ceremonies related to the Columbia River Treaty. |
| 2 | April 14–15, 1966 | Mexico | Mexico, D.F. | Informal visit. Met with President Gustavo Díaz Ordaz. |
| 3 | August 21–22, 1966 | Canada | Campobello Island, Chamcook | Laid cornerstone at Roosevelt Campobello International Park. Conferred informally with Prime Minister Lester B. Pearson. |
| 4 | October 19–20, 1966 | New Zealand | Wellington | State visit. Met with Prime Minister Keith Holyoake. |
| 4 | October 20–23, 1966 | Australia | Canberra, Melbourne, Sydney, Brisbane, Townsville | State visit. Met with Governor-General Richard Casey and Prime Minister Harold Holt. Intended as a "thank-you" visit for the Australian government's solid support for the Vietnam War effort, the president and first lady were greeted by demonstrations from anti-war protesters. |
| 4 | October 24–26, 1966 | Philippines | Manila, Los Baños, Corregidor | Attended a summit with the heads of State and government of Australia, South Korea, New Zealand, the Philippines, South Vietnam, and Thailand. The meeting ended with pronouncements to stand fast against communist aggression and to promote ideals of democracy and development in Vietnam and across Asia. |
| 4 | October 26, 1966 | South Vietnam | Cam Ranh Base | Visited U.S. military personnel. |
| 4 | October 27–30, 1966 | Thailand | Bangkok | State visit. Met with King Bhumibol Adulyadej. |
| 4 | October 30–31, 1966 | Malaysia | Kuala Lumpur | State visit. Met with Prime Minister Tunku Abdul Rahman |
| 4 | October 31 – November 2, 1966 | South Korea | Seoul, Suwon | State visit. Met with President Park Chung Hee and Prime Minister Chung Il-kwon. Addressed National Assembly. |
| 5 | December 3, 1966 | Mexico | Ciudad Acuña | Informal meeting with President Gustavo Díaz Ordaz. Inspected construction of Amistad Dam. |
| 6 | April 11–14, 1967 | Uruguay | Punta del Este | Summit meeting with Latin American heads of state. |
| 6 | April 14, 1967 | (Suriname (Kingdom of the Netherlands)) Suriname | Paramaribo | Refueling stop en route from Uruguay. |
| 7 | April 23–26, 1967 | West Germany | Bonn | Attended the funeral of Chancellor Konrad Adenauer and conversed with various heads of state. |
| 8 | May 25, 1967 | Canada | Montreal, Ottawa | Met with Governor General Roland Michener. Attended Expo 67. Conferred informally with Prime Minister Lester B. Pearson. |
| 9 | October 28, 1967 | Mexico | Ciudad Juarez | Attended transfer of El Chamizal from the U.S. to Mexico. Conferred with President Gustavo Díaz Ordaz. |
| 10 | December 21–22, 1967 | Australia | Canberra | Attended the funeral of Prime Minister Harold Holt. Conferred with other attending heads of state. |
| 10 | December 23, 1967 | Thailand | Khorat | Visited U.S. military personnel. |
| 10 | December 23, 1967 | South Vietnam | Cam Ranh Base | Visited U.S. military personnel. Addressing the troops, Johnson declares "...all the challenges have been met. The enemy is not beaten, but he knows that he has met his master in the field." |
| 10 | December 23, 1967 | Pakistan | Karachi | Met with President Ayub Khan. |
| 10 | December 23, 1967 | Italy | Rome | Met with President Giuseppe Saragat and Prime Minister Aldo Moro. |
| 10 | December 23, 1967 | Vatican City | Apostolic Palace | Audience with Pope Paul VI. |
| 11 | July 6–8, 1968 | El Salvador | San Salvador | Attended the Conference of Presidents of the Central American Republics. |
| 11 | July 8, 1968 | Nicaragua | Managua | Informal visit. Met with President Anastasio Somoza Debayle. |
| 11 | July 8, 1968 | Costa Rica | San José | Informal visit. Met with President José Joaquín Trejos Fernández. |
| 11 | July 8, 1968 | Honduras | San Pedro Sula | Informal visit. Met with President Oswaldo López Arellano. |
| 11 | July 8, 1968 | Guatemala | Guatemala City | Informal visit. Met with President Julio César Méndez Montenegro. |
