= The Men Who Built America: Frontiersmen =

American television miniseries

- Genre: Biography; Docudrama
- Written by: Adam Jonas Segaller; Brian Burstein; Stephen David; Zachary Herrmann; Jereimah Murphy; Jordan Rosenblum; Peter Sherman
- Directed by: John Ealer
- Starring: Jonathan C. Stewart; Gareth Reeves; Derek Charition; Joseph Charition; Robert I. Mesa
- Narrated by: Campbell Scott
- Theme music composer: "Born Ready" by Zayde Wølf
- Original language: English
- No. of episodes: 8

Production
- Executive producers: Leonardo DiCaprio; Jennifer Davisson; Stephen David; Tim W. Kelly; Yoshi Stone; Russell McCarroll; Kristen Burns
- Producers: John Ealer; Brian Burstein; Petra Hoebel
- Production location: Wellington, New Zealand
- Cinematography: Simon Baumfield; Johnny Staint-Ours
- Editors: Joe Headrick; Tim W. Kelly; John Kilgour; Matthew Nelson
- Production companies: Appian Way Productions; A&E Television Networks; Stephen David Entertainment

Original release
- Network: History
- Release: March 7 – March 28, 2018

Related
- The Innovators: The Men Who Built America

The Men Who Built America: Frontiersmen is a six-hour, four-part miniseries docudrama which premiered on March 7, 2018 on the History Channel. It is a complement to the 2012 docudrama The Men Who Built America. The series follows the lives of Daniel Boone, Lewis and Clark, Davy Crockett, Andrew Jackson, and others who blazed new trails across America's wilderness. The series is narrated by Campbell Scott, directed by John Ealer and executive produced by Leonardo DiCaprio.

It is the third installment of the That Built franchise.

== Cast ==
=== Main ===
- Jonathan C. Stewart as Daniel Boone
- Gareth Reeves as Davy Crockett
- Derek Charition as Meriwether Lewis
- Joseph Carlson as William Clark
- Robert I. Mesa as Tecumseh
- Nathan Stevens as Kit Carson
- Adam Jonas Segaller as John C. Frémont
- David Stevens as Andrew Jackson

=== Guest ===
- Madeleine Adams as Jemima Boone
- Moses Brings Plenty as Blackfish
- Phil Peleton as Judge John Henderson
- Simba Matshe as Pompey
- Andrew Robert as William Henry Harrison
- William Strongheart as Tenskwatawa "The Prophet"
- Melissa Kramer as Sacagawea
- Adam Gardiner as Thomas Jefferson
- John Bach as James Madison
- Cohen Holloway as General John Coffee
- John Wraight as William Fitzgerald
- Barry Mawer as General Henry Proctor
- Matt Cleaver as Sam Houston
- Paul Yates as John Alexander Forbes
- Arlo MacDiramid as James K. Polk
- Jed Brophy as Stephen Kearny

== Episodes ==
Eight individual episodes were produced for the series; however, for the program's initial broadcast on History Channel, they were combined into four episodes.

No.	Title	Original release date
1	"Into the Wilderness"	March 7, 2018
2	"Into the Wilderness"	March 7, 2018
During the height of American Revolutionary War, the fighting spreads beyond the colonies into the wildness. Pioneer Daniel Boone establishes the settlement Boonesborough, Kentucky in Kentucky Territory. It is soon threatened by the Shawnee and their leader Blackfish who allied with the British to regain their land. When the war ends with the signing of the Treaty of Paris and the British surrender, the Native Americans do not. In 1783, in the Northwest Territory, warrior Tecumseh ignites the fight for the frontier out west.
3	"Never Surrender"	March 14, 2018
4	"Never Surrender"	March 14, 2018
On the orders of President Thomas Jefferson, Army captains Lewis and Clark explore the newly acquired Louisiana Territory, and with the help of their guide Sacagawea, they make their legendary expedition to the Pacific. After the Battle of Fallen Timbers, Tecumseh unites the Native American tribes by forming an alliance to resist U.S. expansion. When he learns about the Battle of Tippecanoe, the Shawnee leader aligns with the British in Canada and another war for America's independence begins; the War of 1812.
5	"Live Free or Die"	March 21, 2018
6	"Live Free or Die"	March 21, 2018
With the British and Tecumseh's Pan-Indian alliance broken in the north, the south is threatened by the Red Sticks of the Creek tribe when they massacre 500 settlers at Fort Mims. General Andrew Jackson joins the fight to defend the frontier, and becomes a national hero at the Battle of New Orleans. However, his methods at Tallushatchee starts a fierce rivalry with woodsman Davy Crockett who is against Jackson's Indian Removal Act when he is president. Crockett starts a new life in Texas, unbeknownst that a war is brewing with Mexico.
7	"Empire of Liberty"	March 28, 2018
8	"Empire of Liberty"	March 28, 2018
In 1836, General Santa Anna and his Mexican army defeat the Texian uprising at the Alamo, along with Davy Crockett, who was one of the last survivors. This spurs on Sam Houston to form an army and avenge the celebrated frontierman's death. President James Polk wants to further expand the United States to the Pacific. In 1842, Polk assigns surveyor John Frémont and his guide Kit Carson to chart a path to the Northwest; creating the Oregon Trail. They are tasked to secretly incite a rebellion to take California, which later ignites a war with Mexico. Gaining this 31st state proves fruitful with the discovery of gold.
