= CIA activities in Syria =

Central Intelligence Agency activities in Syria since the agency's inception in 1947 have included coup attempts and assassination plots, and in more recent years, extraordinary renditions, a paramilitary strike, and funding and military training of forces opposed to the current government.

== Coup of 1949 ==
On 30 March 1949, Syrian Army Colonel Husni al-Za'im seized power from President Shukri al-Quwatli in a bloodless coup d'état. There are "highly controversial" allegations that the American legation in Syria—headed by James Hugh Keeley Jr.—and the CIA engineered the coup. Assistant military attaché (and undercover CIA officer) Stephen J. Meade, who became intimately acquainted with Colonel Za'im several weeks prior to the coup and was considered his "principal Western confidant" during Za'im's brief time in power, has been described as the coup's architect—along with the CIA's Damascus station chief, Miles Copeland Jr. Copeland later authored several books with "extraordinarily detailed accounts of CIA operations in, among other countries, Syria, Egypt, and Iran," considered "one of the most revelatory set of writings by a former US intelligence officer ever published." However, Copeland's memoirs have a strong literary quality and contain many embellishments, making it difficult to gauge the historical accuracy of the events he describes. Moreover, Copeland's account of the Syrian coup in his 1989 autobiography The Game Player: Confessions of the CIA's Original Political Operative contradicts the earlier version presented in his 1969 The Game of Nations: The Amorality of Power Politics.

In The Game of Nations, Copeland suggested that Syria—as the first former colony in the Arab world to achieve complete political independence from Europe—was perceived in Washington as a test case for America's "capacity for exerting a democratizing influence on Arab countries." According to Copeland, the CIA attempted to "police" the July 1947 Syrian parliamentary election, which was marred by fraud, sectarianism, and interference by neighboring Iraq and Transjordan. When these elections "produced a weak, minority government" under Quwatli—the stability of which was called into question by Syria's defeat in the 1948 Arab–Israeli War—Keeley and other US officials became concerned "that Syria was on the verge of complete collapse," which could have empowered the Syrian Communist Party or other "radicals" (such as the Ba'ath Party and the Muslim Brotherhood). As a result, Keeley became amenable to a military coup "as a way of safeguarding ... the long-term prospects of democracy in the country." At Keeley's behest, Copeland wrote, Meade "systematically developed a friendship with Za'im ... suggested to him the idea of a coup d'état, advised him how to go about it, and guided him through the intricate preparations in laying the groundwork for it."

Available evidence, however, suggests that Za'im was in little need of prodding from the US According to the British military attaché in Syria, Za'im had been contemplating a coup since March 1947—over a year before he was introduced to Meade on 30 November 1948. Shortly before the coup, Za'im tried to win Western sympathy by producing a list of individuals, including Keeley, that were supposedly "communist assassination targets," but US officials were skeptical. While Za'im directly informed Meade of the upcoming coup on 3 and 7 March, the US was not the only foreign power apprised: Za'im notified British officials around the same time. In his conversations with Meade, Za'im outlined his progressive political program for Syria (including land reform) as well as his plans for dealing with the communist threat, concluding "[there is] only way to start the Syrian people along the road to progress and democracy: With the whip." Za'im struck a different tone in conversations with the British, citing his desire to establish friendlier ties with Britain's major allies in the area—Iraq and Transjordan. In The Game Player, Copeland provided new details on the American assistance to Za'im's plan, expounding that Meade identified specific installations that had to be captured to ensure the coup's success. However, Copeland also acknowledged that Za'im had initiated the plot on his own: "It was Husni's show all the way." Douglas Little notes that US assistant secretary of state George C. McGhee visited Damascus in March, "ostensibly to discuss resettling Palestinian refugees but possibly to authorize US support for Za'im." In contrast, Andrew Rathmell describes this hypothesis as "purely speculative." Once in power, Za'im enacted a number of policies that benefited the US: he ratified the construction on Syrian territory of the Trans-Arabian Pipeline (Tapline) (which had been stalled in the Syrian parliament), banned the Communist Party, and signed an armistice with Israel.

== Attempted regime change, 1956–57 ==
The CIA made plans to overthrow the Syrian government because it would not cooperate with Western anti-communism. Early in 1956, the plan initially called for the use of the Iraqi Army; it then shifted its focus to agents within Syria itself.

=== Operation Straggle, 1956 ===
National Security Council member Wilbur Crane Eveland, CIA official Archibald Roosevelt, and Michail Bey Ilyan, former Syrian minister, met in Damascus on 1 July 1956 to discuss a US-backed 'anti-communist' takeover of the country. They made a plan, scheduled for enactment on 25 October 1956, in which the military would

take control of Damascus, Aleppo, Homs, and Hamah. The frontier posts with Jordan, Iraq, and Lebanon would also be captured in order to seal Syria's borders until the radio stations announced that a new government had taken over under Colonel Kabbani, who would place armored units at key positions throughout Damascus. Once control had been established, Ilyan would inform the civilians he'd selected that they were to form a new government, but in order to avoid leaks none of them would be told until just a week before the coup.

The CIA backed this plan (known as "Operation Straggle") with 500,000 Syrian pounds (worth about $167,000) and the promise to support the new government. Although Secretary of State John Foster Dulles publicly opposed a coup, privately he had consulted with the CIA and recommended the plan to President Eisenhower.

The plan was postponed for five days, during which time the Suez Crisis happened. Ilyan told Eveland he could not succeed in overthrowing the Syrian government during a war of Israeli aggression. On 31 October, John Foster Dulles informed his brother Allen Dulles, the Director of the CIA: "Re Straggle our people feel that conditions are such that it would be a mistake to try to pull it off". Eveland speculated that this coincidence had been engineered by the British in order to defuse US criticism of the invasion of Egypt.

=== Operation Wappen, 1957 ===
DCI Allen Dulles continued to file reports about the dangers of Communism in Syria. The CIA planned for another coup, code-named "Operation Wappen" and organized by Kermit Roosevelt. Syrian military officers were paid off in anticipation. Bribes reportedly totaled $3,000,000.

The coup failed when some of these officers revealed the plan to the Syrian intelligence service. They turned in the CIA bribe money and identified the officers who had tendered it. Robert Molloy, Francis Jeton, and Howard E. "Rocky" Stone were all deported. The US State Department denied Syrian accusations of a coup attempt, and banned Syria's ambassador to the US. US Ambassador James Moose, who was on home leave during the coup, but surely knew its details, was not allowed back into the country. The New York Times backed the US government's claim and suggested that the story had been fabricated for political purposes. The decision by President Eisenhower and Secretary Dulles, to appoint veteran diplomat Charles W. Yost as the new US Ambassador to Syria, was meant to help clean up the mess that the president had created.

After the coup attempt was exposed, the US government and media began describing Syria as a "Soviet satellite". One intelligence report suggested that the USSR had delivered "not more than 123 Migs" to the country. Reporter Kennett Love later said that "there were indeed 'not more than 123 Migs'. There were none." In September 1957, the US deployed a fleet to the Mediterranean, armed several of Syria's neighbors, and incited Turkey to deploy 50,000 troops to its border. Secretary of State John Foster Dulles suggested that the US sought to invoke the "Eisenhower Doctrine" of retaliating against provocations, and this intention was later confirmed in a military report. No Arab state would describe Syria as a provocateur, and these military deployments were withdrawn.

=== Assassination plot, 1957 ===
Explicit documents from September 1957 reveal a plot, including collaboration with the British intelligence service MI6 in a plot, to assassinate three Syrian officials in Damascus. These targets were: Abdel Hamid al-Sarraj, head of military intelligence; Afif al-Bizri, army chief of staff; and Khalid Bakdash, leader of the Syrian Communist Party—all figures who had gained politically from exposure of "the American plot". Details about this conspiracy were revealed by a "Working Group Report" uncovered in 2003 among the papers of British Defence Minister Duncan Sandys:

Once a political decision is reached to proceed with internal disturbances in Syria, CIA is prepared, and SIS [MI6] will attempt, to mount minor sabotage and coup de main incidents within Syria, working through contacts with individuals.

The two services should consult, as appropriate, to avoid any overlapping or interference with each other's activities... Incidents should not be concentrated in Damascus; the operation should not be overdone; and to the extent possible care should be taken to avoid causing key leaders of the Syrian regime to take additional personal protection measures.

In the "Preferred Plan" drafted by the Working Group Report, the US and UK intelligence agencies would fund a "Free Syria Committee" and supply weapons to paramilitary groups, including the Muslim Brotherhood. Syria would be "made to appear as the sponsor of plots, sabotage and violence directed against neighboring governments". These provocations would serve as the pretext for an outside invasion, led theoretically by the Kingdom of Iraq.

The Working Group Report stated that it would be "impossible to exaggerate the importance of the psychological warfare aspects of the present exercise", meaning that it would be necessary to convince people in Syria, Iraq, Jordan, Lebanon and Egypt that a state of emergency was at hand. Radio transmitters were deployed and the CIA prepared to send advisors to allied countries. The plan was developed quickly and re-used elements of the CIA's 1954 coup in Guatemala as well as its actions in Iran during 1953.

The "Preferred Plan" was aborted after renewed diplomatic engagement by Saudi Arabia and Iraq, followed by direct military support to Syria from Egypt, made a regional war seem unlikely. However, the Syria Working Group provided a model for other CIA interventions— most immediately, in Indonesia.

== Espionage and intelligence operations, 1960s–2000s ==
In February 1965, Syrian authorities announced that they had uncovered a US-linked spy network operating in Damascus, arrested several alleged members and expelled Walter S. Snowdon, the second secretary of the US embassy, accusing him of involvement in the network.

According to journalist Joby Warrick, a senior Syrian scientist involved in the country's chemical weapons program, identified by the pseudonym "Ayman", became a CIA asset in the 1990s. He reportedly provided the CIA with sensitive information about Syria's chemical weapons program and received payments through a foreign bank account. In late 2001, Syrian intelligence detained Ayman over suspected corruption. Believing that the authorities had discovered his CIA ties, he reportedly confessed to spying for the United States. He was subsequently sentenced to death and executed by firing squad at Adra Prison on 7 April 2002.

== Extraordinary rendition, 2001–03 ==
The CIA used Syria as an illicit base of operations to torture so-called "ghost detainees", as part of a program known as extraordinary rendition. This program was established in the mid-1990s and expanded in the 2000s.

One target of this program, Syrian-born Canadian Maher Arar, was detained in New York and sent to Syria, where he was interrogated and tortured. Arar, a telecommunications engineer who has been a Canadian citizen since 1991, was asked to confess his connections to al-Qaeda and to terrorist training camps in Afghanistan. Arar was held for more than a year; after his release, he sued the US government. According to a US Judge (and confirmed by Canadian investigators):

During his first twelve days in Syrian detention, Arar was interrogated for eighteen hours per day and was physically and psychologically tortured. He was beaten on his palms, hips, and lower back with a two-inch-thick electric cable. His captors also used their fists to beat him on his stomach, his face, and the back of his neck. He was subjected to excruciating pain and pleaded with his captors to stop, but they would not. He was placed in a room where he could hear the screams of other detainees being tortured and was told that he, too, would be placed in a spine-breaking "chair", hung upside down in a "tire" for beatings, and subjected to electric shocks. To lessen his exposure to the torture, Arar falsely confessed, among other things, to having trained with terrorists in Afghanistan, even though he had never been to Afghanistan and had never been involved in terrorist activity.

Arar alleges that his interrogation in Syria was coordinated and planned by US officials, who sent the Syrians a dossier containing specific questions. As evidence of this, Arar notes that the interrogations in the United States and Syria contained identical questions, including a specific question about his relationship with a particular individual wanted for terrorism. In return, the Syrian officials supplied US officials with all information extracted from Arar; plaintiff cites a statement by one Syrian official who has publicly stated that the Syrian government shared information with the United States that it extracted from Arar. See Complaint Ex. E (21 January 2004 transcript of CBS's Sixty Minutes II: "His Year in Hell").

The US initially invoked the "state secrets privilege". When legal proceedings began anyway, the Ashcroft Justice Department was ridiculed for arguing that Arar was in fact a member of al-Qaeda. The Canadian government apologized to Arar but the US has not admitted wrongdoing.

Journalist Stephen Grey has identified eight other people tortured on behalf of the CIA at the same prison ("Palestine Branch") in Syria. The CIA imprisoned a German businessman, Mohammad Haydr Zammar, and transferred him from Morocco to the Syrian prison. They subsequently offered German intelligence officials the opportunity to submit questions for Zammar, and asked Germany to overlook Syria's human rights abuses because of cooperation in the War on Terror.

According to a 2013 report by the Open Society Foundations, Syria was one of the "most common destinations for rendered suspects" under the program. Former CIA agent Robert Baer described the policy to the New Statesman in July 2004: "If you want a serious interrogation, you send a prisoner to Jordan. If you want them to be tortured, you send them to Syria. If you want someone to disappear – never to see them again – you send them to Egypt".

== Paramilitary operations, 2004–08 ==
In February 2008, Imad Mughniyeh, a senior Hezbollah commander, was assassinated in Damascus in a joint CIA–Mossad operation, according to US officials cited by The Washington Post. CIA personnel were reportedly on the ground in Damascus and helped track Mughniyeh's movements.

On Sunday, 26 October 2008, the CIA conducted a paramilitary raid on the town of Sukkariyeh in eastern Syria. The raid involved "about two dozen US commandos in specially equipped Black Hawk helicopters", according to reporters for The New York Times. The US said it had killed an Iraqi who was supplying insurgents from across the Syrian border.

Syria accused the US of committing "terrorist aggression" and said that eight civilians had been killed. The US responded that all people killed in the raid were "militants". The Syrian government closed an American cultural center and the US-sponsored Damascus Community School in response. The incident also led to a mass rally in Damascus in which protestors criticized the raid (the Syrian government supported the rally but deployed riot police to protect the US buildings from angry protestors).

Following the raid, the New York Times revealed the existence of a secret 2004 military order authorizing actions by the CIA and the Special Forces in 15–20 countries, including Syria. US officials acknowledged that they had conducted other raids in Syria since 2004, but did not provide details.

== War, 2011–2017 ==
In 2011, a civil war broke out in Syria. Leaked diplomatic cables reported that the US government had been covertly funding Syrian opposition groups since 2006, mainly the London-based Movement for Justice and Development in Syria and an associated satellite TV channel Barada TV. Special Activities Division teams were said to have been deployed to Syria during the uprising to ascertain rebel groups, leadership and potential supply routes.

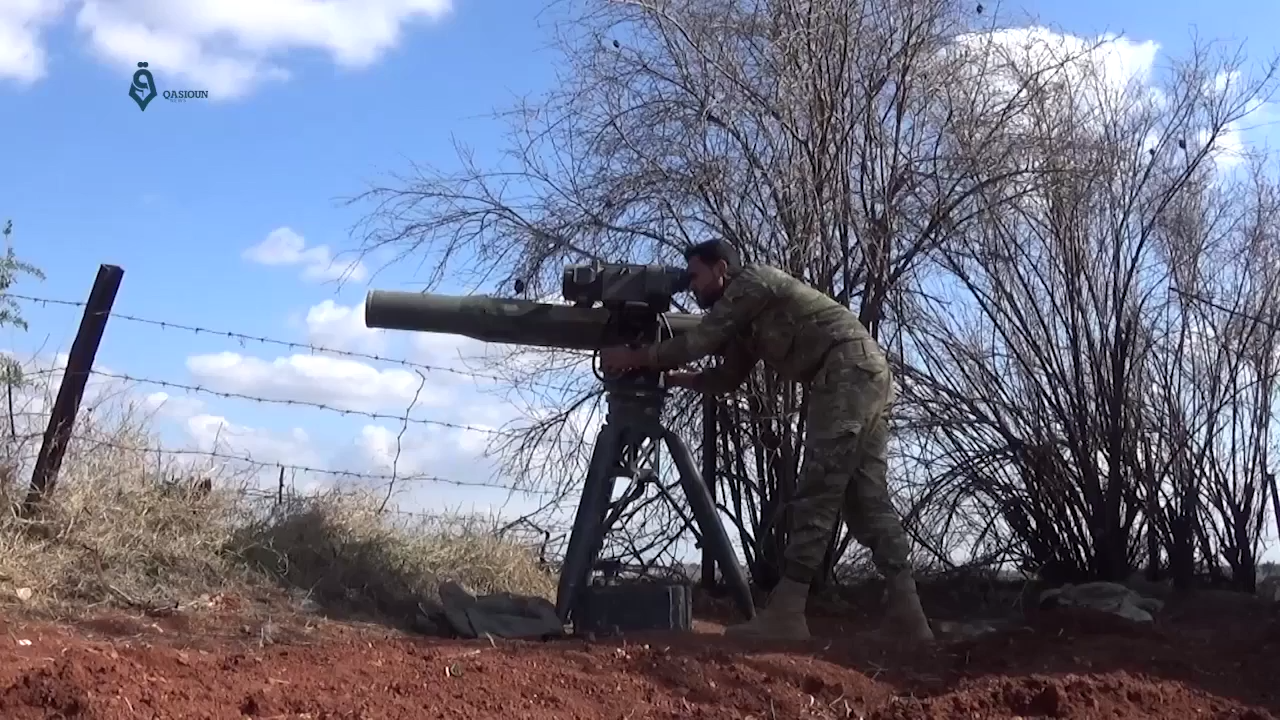
Rebels of the Army of Glory launch a US-made BGM-71 TOW anti-tank missile at government forces during the 2017 Hama offensive.

Under the aegis of operation Timber Sycamore and other clandestine activities, CIA operatives and US special operations troops have trained and armed nearly 10,000 rebel fighters at a cost of $1 billion a year. In early September 2013, President Barack Obama told US senators that the CIA had trained the first 50-man insurgent element and that they had been inserted into Syria. The deployment of this unit and the supplying of weapons may be the first tangible measure of support since the US stated they would begin providing assistance to the opposition.

Obama's refusal to directly arm or train Syrian rebels prior to 2013, and his rejection of a 2012 outline for "CIA intervention in Syria" suggested by then-CIA Director David Petraeus was motivated by his own belief that past instances of the CIA supporting insurgencies rarely "worked out well." The program he ultimately approved was designed not to give the rebels enough support to achieve victory, but rather to engineer a stalemate that would encourage a negotiated resolution of the Syrian Civil War—which US officials envisioned as including the resignation of Syrian President Bashar al-Assad. The CIA trained 10,000 rebels "in Jordan and Turkey" at facilities run with the cooperation of the Jordanian and Turkish governments, but strict prohibitions were placed on the US or its allies introducing "certain classes of weapons" (such as MANPADs) into the conflict due to fears they could be captured by terrorists—this despite the fact that all CIA-supported rebels are "vetted" for possible extremist ties. Assad was in danger of being overthrown until the 2015 Russian military intervention in Syria changed the course of the war, causing a split within the Obama administration between officials like CIA Director John O. Brennan and Secretary of Defense Ashton Carter—who advocated "doubling down" on the program—and opponents including White House Chief of Staff Denis McDonough and Secretary of State John Kerry—who expressed doubts that escalating the CIA's role could achieve meaningful results without forcing "an asymmetric response by Russia."

On 14 October 2016, against the backdrop of the siege of "rebel-held sections" of the city of Aleppo by Russian and Syrian aircraft, Obama was presented by his National Security Council with a "Plan B" to "deliver truck-mounted antiaircraft weapons that could help rebel units but would be difficult for a terrorist group to conceal and use against civilian aircraft"; Obama declined to make a decision on the matter, raising the prospect "that tens of thousands of CIA-backed fighters will search for more-reliable allies, and that the United States will lose leverage over regional partners that until now have refrained from delivering more-dangerous arms to Assad's opponents." Following Russia's intervention, top US officials began emphasizing "the fight against the Islamic State [ISIL], rather than against the Assad government," but supporters of the CIA program "disagree with this rationale, saying that the Islamic State can't be eradicated until a new government emerges capable of controlling the terrorist group's territory in Raqqa and elsewhere," and that "the [Free Syrian Army] remains the only vehicle to pursue those goals." In contrast, "one senior US official said that it is time for a 'ruthless' look at whether agency-supported fighters can still be considered moderate, and whether the program can accomplish anything beyond adding to the carnage in Syria," asking: "What has this program become, and how will history record this effort?" After the Defense Department's overt $500 million effort to train thousands of Syrians to fight ISIL was revealed to have produced only "four or five" active combatants as of September 2015, largely because the vast majority of potential recruits considered Assad their main enemy—an admission that prompted widespread congressional derision—the US military began airdrops of lethal equipment to established rebel organizations; reports soon emerged of "CIA-armed units and Pentagon-armed ones" battling each other.

While the Defense Department's program to aid predominantly Kurdish rebels fighting ISIL will continue, it was revealed in July 2017 that President Donald Trump had ordered a "phasing out" of the CIA's support for anti-Assad rebels, a move some US officials characterized as a "major concession" to Russia. According to David Ignatius, writing in The Washington Post, while the CIA program ultimately failed in its objective of removing Assad from power, it was hardly "bootless": "The program pumped many hundreds of millions of dollars to many dozens of militia groups. One knowledgeable official estimates that the CIA-backed fighters may have killed or wounded 100,000 Syrian soldiers and their allies over the past four years."

During an interview with The Wall Street Journal in July 2017 President Donald Trump claimed many of the CIA-supplied weapons ended up in the hands of "Al Qaeda", which often fought alongside the CIA-backed rebels.

== Reduction and withdrawal of US forces, 2018–2026 ==
In December 2018, US President Donald Trump announced that US troops involved in the fight against the Islamic State (ISIS) in northeast Syria would be withdrawn imminently. Trump's surprise decision overturned Washington's policy in the Middle East. It fueled the ambitions and anxieties of local and regional actors vying over the future shape of Syria. Some experts proposed that President Trump could mitigate the damage of his withdrawal of US military forces from Syria by using the CIA's Special Activities Center.

In October 2019, following a phone call between Trump and Turkish President Recep Tayyip Erdoğan, US forces withdrew from positions along the Syrian-Turkish border, allowing Turkey to launch an offensive against the Syrian Democratic Forces. The US subsequently repositioned much of its remaining military presence in eastern Syria, where forces continued counter-ISIS operations alongside the SDF.

Following the fall of the Assad regime in December 2024, US forces continued working with the SDF against ISIS while Washington established contacts with the Syrian transitional government. In 2025, the United States supported negotiations between the SDF and the interim Syrian government over the future integration of northeastern Syria.

In February 2026, US forces began withdrawing from major positions, including the strategic al-Tanf garrison. On 16 April 2026, the United States completed its withdrawal from its last major base in Syria, ending more than a decade of US military presence in the country.

== See also ==
- Imad Mugniyah
- Modern history of Syria
- Foreign interventions by the United States
- United States involvement in regime change
- CIA activities in Lebanon
