= Syrian Crisis of 1957 =

Period of severe diplomatic confrontations during the Cold War

1957 Syrian Crisis
- Part of the Cold War
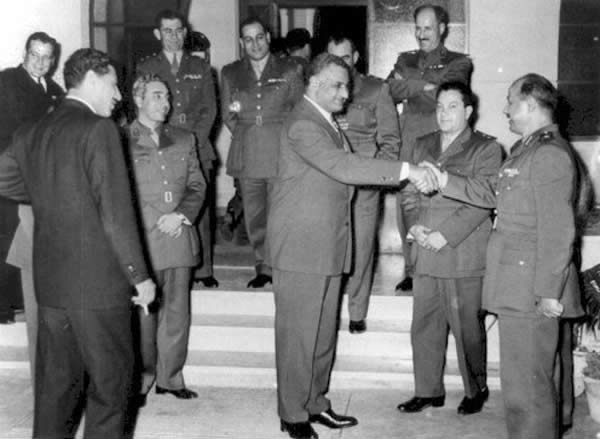
- Gamal Abdel Nasser meeting Syrian delegation pushing for unity between Egypt and Syria
Date	18 August – late October 1957
Location	Syria–Turkey border
Result	Turkey halts its border operations

Belligerents
Turkey; United States; Baghdad Pact	Syria; Soviet Union; Egypt

Commanders and leaders
(Turkey) Celâl Bayar (United States) Dwight Eisenhower (United States) John Foster Dulles	(Second Syrian Republic) Shukri al-Quwatli (Soviet Union) Nikita Khrushchev (Egypt) Gamal Abdel Nasser

The Syrian Crisis of 1957 was a period of severe diplomatic confrontations during the Cold War that involved Syria and the Soviet Union on one hand, and the United States and its allies, including Turkey and the Baghdad Pact, on the other.

The tensions began on August 18, when the Syrian government presided by Shukri al-Quwatli made a series of institutional changes, such as the appointment of Col. Afif al-Bizri as chief-of-staff of the Syrian Army, who was alleged by Western governments to be a Soviet sympathizer. Suspicion that a communist takeover had occurred in Damascus grew larger, prompting neighboring Iraq, Jordan and Lebanon to consider supporting an Arab or Western military intervention to overthrow the Syrian government. Turkey was the only country to step in by deploying thousands of troops along the Syrian-Turkish border. Nikita Khrushchev threatened that he would launch missiles at Turkey if it attacked Syria, while the United States said that it could attack the Soviet Union in response to an assault on Turkey. The crisis ended in late October, when Turkey agreed to cease its border operations following pressure by the United States, and when Khrushchev made an unexpected visit to the Turkish embassy in Moscow.

The events are widely seen as a major failure of the Eisenhower Doctrine, which stressed that the United States could intervene militarily on behalf of a Middle Eastern ally to fight "international communism".

== Events ==
Time approaching, if indeed not already arrived, when Syria will cease be effectively an independent nation but will have been taken over as was Czechoslovakia in 1948 and made into Soviet satellite having independence only in name and not in substance. We also convinced that once present group now in control Damascus has consolidated its position in Syria it will reach out in efforts subvert surrounding countries, thus propagating Communist virus and paving way for control by elements subservient to Moscow.
— Telegram from the US embassy in Saudi Arabia to the State Department.

The crisis began in mid-August, when the Syrian government made a series of important moves, furthering the idea that communists were in control of Damascus. Such changes included the replacement of Tawfik Nizam al-Din by Col. Afif al-Bizri as chief-of-staff of the Syrian Army. The latter was suspected by Western governments of being a pro-Soviet fellow traveller. This came four days after Syria expelled three American diplomats who were accused by Damascus of plotting to overthrow the government.

President Dwight D. Eisenhower's special envoy to the Middle East, James P. Richards, warned about moving too fast and believed that the tensions could "change character and ease off in a few days or weeks", following Anglo-American talks in response to the incidents. US Secretary of State, John Foster Dulles, described the situation as "totally unacceptable" and called for further efforts to prevent Syria from becoming a "Soviet satellite". He had hoped, however, that a violent response to the developments would be prevented, especially by Israel. On August 21, as advised by Dulles, Eisenhower made unclear statements on the events during a press conference, without alleging that the Syrian government was communist-controlled. Syria responded with another press conference two days later, stating that Damascus was committed to "positive neutralism", a foreign policy doctrine that stressed independence from the "paternalism" of the Cold War superpowers.

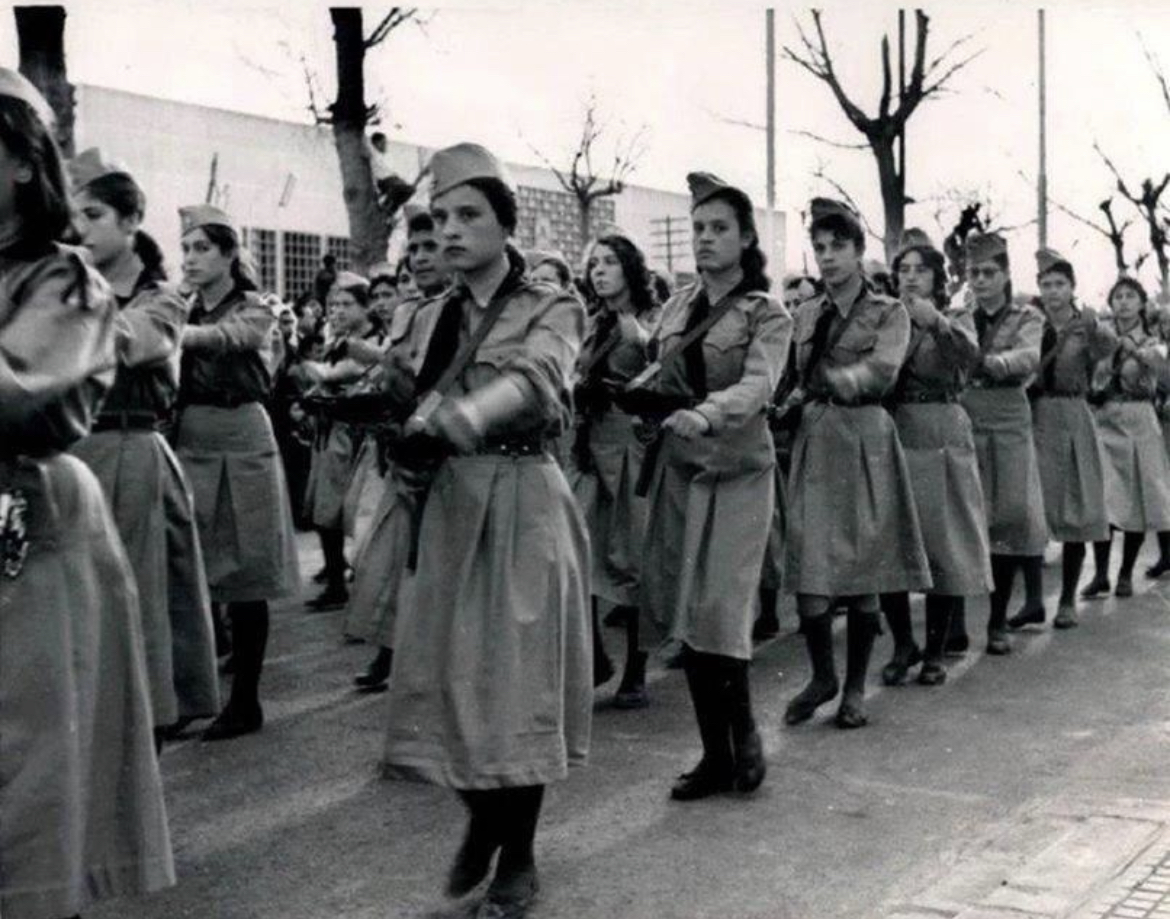
Syrian scouts on the parade at the year of the crisis.

By the end of August, both Washington and London were convinced that Syria was no longer on the non-aligned camp, and that something had to be done in order to prevent the subverting of neighboring countries. In a letter to Dulles on August 28, British Prime Minister Harold Macmillan described Soviet leader Nikita Khrushchev as "a more dangerous man even than Stalin", and further stressed the importance of taking action so that neighboring Lebanon, Jordan, and eventually Iraq don't fall under the Soviet sphere of influence. The same day, British ambassador to Jordan, Sir Charles Johnston, said that the Jordanian government was aware of anti-government cells within Syria that it considered arming, but then gave up the idea and decided to wait for further developments. At the end of the month, Eisenhower sent Loy W. Henderson as a special envoy to the Middle East, who was to work out a solution to the crisis by consulting different involved governments, all except the Syrian government.

On September 2, Secretary Dulles said during a press conference in Washington, that all the countries bordering Syria were of the opinion that Syria would become a communist state if nothing had been done within the next 60 days. This came after Henderson delivered Eisenhower a report from his visit to the Middle East. It also followed a series of important diplomatic exchanges between officials from different countries, during which it was revealed that Israel was willing to take military action, unless other countries neighboring Syria decided to "seal off" the country, which was discussed in the beginning of September during a meeting in Ankara between Turkish Prime Minister Adnan Menderes, Iraqi Crown Prince Abd al-Ilah and the American ambassador in Turkey. Israel was eventually pressured by the West to show restraint and not to react. 'Abd al-Ilah was cautious, as he wanted to consult Jordan first before making any move. A penetration of Syrian territory through Jordan appeared like an "easier" plan to him than through the Iraqi-Syrian border. Turkey, however, was willing to adopt military measures, since it viewed the situation as a matter of its national security.

== Bibliography ==
- Abou-El-Fadl, Reem (2019). "Turkey and the Syrian Crisis, 1957: Linking Spheres". Foreign Policy As Nation Making: Turkey and Egypt in the Cold War. Cambridge University Press.
- Abou-El-Fadl, Reem (2013). "Turkey's Cold War Alliance: Nation-building and the Utility of the 1957 Syrian Crisis". In Tür, Özlem; Hinnebusch, Raymond (eds.). Turkey-Syria Relations: Between Enmity and Amity. Routledge.
- Anderson, Philip (1995). "'Summer Madness': The Crisis in Syria, August-October 1957". British Journal of Middle Eastern Studies. 22 (1/2). Taylor & Francis: 21–42. doi:10.1080/13530199508705610. JSTOR 195962.
- Ashton, Nigel John (1996). "The Syrian Crisis and the October 1957 Talks". Eisenhower, Macmillan and the Problem of Nasser: Anglo-American Relations and Arab Nationalism, 1955-59. Palgrave Macmillan London. doi:10.1057/9780230378971_8.
- Blackwell, Stephen (2000). "Britain, the United States and the Syrian crisis, 1957". Diplomacy and Statecraft. 11 (3): 139–158. doi:10.1080/09592290008406174. S2CID 153876194.
- Bogle, Lori Lyn (2001). The Cold War: Hot wars of the Cold War. Taylor & Francis. pp. 156–163. ISBN 9780815332404.
- Brecher, Michael (1997). A Study of Crisis. University of Michigan Press. pp. 345–346. ISBN 9780472108060.
- Brown, Kevin (2013). "The Syrian Crisis of 1957: A Lesson for the 21st Century" (PDF). CPD Perspectives on Public Diplomacy. University of Southern California Center for Public Diplomacy.
- Easter, David (2018). "Soviet intelligence and the 1957 Syrian crisis". Intelligence and National Security. 33 (2): 227–240. doi:10.1080/02684527.2017.1370072. ISSN 0268-4527.
- Gorst, Anthony; Lucas, W. Scott (1989). "The other collusion: Operation straggle and Anglo‐American intervention in Syria, 1955–56". Intelligence and National Security. 4 (3): 576–595. doi:10.1080/02684528908432017. ISSN 0268-4527.
- Jankowski, James P. (2002). Nasser's Egypt, Arab Nationalism, and the United Arab Republic. Lynne Rienner Publishers. ISBN 9781588260345.
- Jones, Matthew (2004). "The 'Preferred Plan': The Anglo-American Working Group Report on Covert Action in Syria, 1957" (PDF). Intelligence and National Security. 19 (3): 401–415. doi:10.1080/0268452042000316214. S2CID 154751229.
- Hahn, Peter L. (2006). "Securing the Middle East: The Eisenhower Doctrine of 1957". Presidential Studies Quarterly. 36 (1): 38–47. ISSN 0360-4918. JSTOR 27552745.
- Hussain, Syed Rifaat (1989). "SUPERPOWERS INTERVENTION IN THE MIDDLE EAST: A Case Study of the U.S. Intervention in Syria, 1957". Strategic Studies. 12 (4): 38–57. ISSN 1029-0990. JSTOR 45182532.
- Kirk, George (1960). "The Syrian Crisis of 1957: Fact and Fiction". International Affairs. 36 (1): 58–61. doi:10.2307/2609310. JSTOR 2609310.
- Laçiner, Sedat; Bal, İhsan (2011). "USAK Yearbook of International Politics and Law: Volume 4". International Strategic Research Organization. 4. ISBN 9786054030477.
- Lesch, David W. (1998). "When the Relationship Went Sour: Syria and the Eisenhower Administration". Presidential Studies Quarterly. 28 (1): 92–107. ISSN 0360-4918. JSTOR 27551833.
- Lesch, David W. (1992). "The Saudi Role in the America‐Syrian Crisis of 1957". Middle East Policy. 1 (3): 33–48. doi:10.1111/j.1475-4967.1992.tb00194.x.
- Lesch, David W. (1992a). Syria and The United States: Eisenhower's Cold War In The Middle East. Westview Press.
- Lesch, David W. (1990). The United States and Syria, 1953-1957: The Cold War in the Middle East (Thesis). Harvard University.
- Little, Douglas (1990). "Cold War and Covert Action: The United States and Syria, 1945-1958". Middle East Journal. 44 (1): 51–75. ISSN 0026-3141. JSTOR 4328056.
- Moubayed, Sami (2012). "The Stone Affair". Syria and the USA: Washington's relations with Damascus from Wilson to Eisenhower. I. B. Tauris.
- Sayle, Timothy Andrews; Colbourn, Susan (2020). "'An Unfortunate Lack of Ideas': NATO's 'Out-of-Area' Debate and the Syrian Crisis of 1957". The International History Review. 42 (2): 336–351. doi:10.1080/07075332.2018.1561492. ISSN 0707-5332.
- Seale, Patrick (1965). The Struggle of Syria. Oxford University Press.
- Pearson, Ivan (2007). "The Syrian Crisis of 1957, the Anglo-American 'Special Relationship', and the 1958 Landings in Jordan and Lebanon". Middle Eastern Studies. 43 (1). Taylor & Francis: 45–64. doi:10.1080/00263200601079625. JSTOR 4284523. S2CID 143680516.
- "Egypt Lands Troops In Syria; Reinforces Country's Defenses". Vol. 132, no. 17. The Stanford Daily. 14 October 1957.
- U.S. Department of State. Foreign Relations of the United States. U.S. Government Printing Office (originally from the University of Michigan). p. 500.
- Yaqub, Salim (2004). Containing Arab Nationalism: The Eisenhower Doctrine and the Middle East. University of North Carolina Press. ISBN 9780807855089.
- Yaqub, Salim (2011). "Contesting Arabism: The Eisenhower Doctrine and the Arab Middle East, 1956-1959" (PDF). 6 (27). The MacMillan Center Council on Middle East Studies: 111–123.
