= CIA activities in Lebanon =

Location of Lebanon (in green)

CIA activities in Lebanon refers to confirmed and alleged activities carried out in Lebanon by the Central Intelligence Agency (CIA).

== Cold War ==
=== 1957 election ===
William Blum has claimed that the CIA financed the campaign of Camille Chamoun during the 1957 election.

=== Hiwar magazine ===
From 1962 to 1967, the CIA funded the Arabic magazine Hiwar under the cover of the Congress for Cultural Freedom. Generous funding was provided by the CIA with the stipulation that it publish articles on the situation of Soviet Muslims.

=== Lebanese civil war ===
Tim Weiner has claimed that Christian leader Bashir Gemayel was the "CIA's most highly placed source in Lebanon" and that the CIA "had another national leader on their payroll". The 1983 US embassy bombing in Beirut killed several 8 CIA agents and in 2023 the CIA called it the "deadliest day in CIA history". The role of the CIA in the 1985 Beirut car bombings has been debated, with Bob Woodward claiming the attack was funded by the CIA and Saudi Arabia. Ronald Reagan, Robert McFarlane, and William Casey's widow claimed that the CIA had no involvement. In the aftermath of the bombing, US officials cancelled its Beirut based counterterrorism operation, that trained Lebenese counterterrorism units, because of indirect links between the CIA and the bombing.

== 21st century ==
In December 2011, Hezbollah chief Hassan Nasrallah released the names of 10 undercover CIA agents working in Lebanon during a televised address on al-Manar, claiming CIA agents conducted meetings at Pizza Hut and Starbucks franchises. Nasrallah claimed the agents were using diplomatic cover.

== See also ==
- CIA activities by country
- Lebanon–United States relations
- CIA activities in Syria
