= Foreign policy of the Eisenhower administration =

The United States foreign policy of the Dwight D. Eisenhower administration, from 1953 to 1961, focused on the Cold War with the Soviet Union and its satellites. The United States built up a stockpile of nuclear weapons and nuclear delivery systems to deter military threats and save money while cutting back on expensive Army combat units. A major uprising broke out in Hungary in 1956; the Eisenhower administration did not become directly involved, but condemned the military invasion by the Soviet Union. Eisenhower sought to reach a nuclear test ban treaty with the Soviet Union, but following the 1960 U-2 incident the Kremlin canceled a scheduled summit in Paris.

As he promised, Eisenhower quickly ended the fighting in Korea, leaving it divided North and South. The U.S. has kept major forces there ever since to deter North Korea. In 1954, he played a key role in the Senate's defeat of the Bricker Amendment, which would have limited the president's treaty making power and ability to enter into executive agreements with foreign leaders. The Eisenhower administration used propaganda and covert action extensively, and the Central Intelligence Agency (CIA) supported two military coups: the 1953 Iranian coup d'état and the 1954 Guatemalan coup d'état. The administration did not approve the partition of Vietnam at the 1954 Geneva Conference, and directed economic and military aid and advice to South Vietnam. Washington led the establishment of the Southeast Asia Treaty Organization as an alliance of anti-Communist states in Southeast Asia. It ended two crises with China over Taiwan.

In 1956, Egyptian President Gamal Abdel Nasser nationalized the Suez Canal, sparking the Suez Crisis, in which a coalition of France, Britain, and Israel attacked Egypt. Concerned about the economic and political impacts of the invasion, Eisenhower had warned the three against any such action. When they invaded anyway he used heavy financial and diplomatic pressures to force a withdrawal. In the aftermath of the crisis, Eisenhower announced the Eisenhower Doctrine, under which any country in the Middle East could request American economic assistance or aid from American military forces.

The Cuban Revolution broke out during Eisenhower's second term, resulting in the replacement of pro-U.S. military dictator Fulgencio Batista with Fidel Castro. In response to the revolution, the Eisenhower administration broke ties with Cuba and Eisenhower approved a CIA operation to carry out a campaign of terrorist attacks and sabotage, kill civilians, and cause economic damage. The CIA also trained and commanded pilots to bomb civilian airfields. The CIA began preparations for an invasion of Cuba by Cuban expatriates, ultimately resulting in the failed Bay of Pigs Invasion after Eisenhower left office.

== Cold War ==
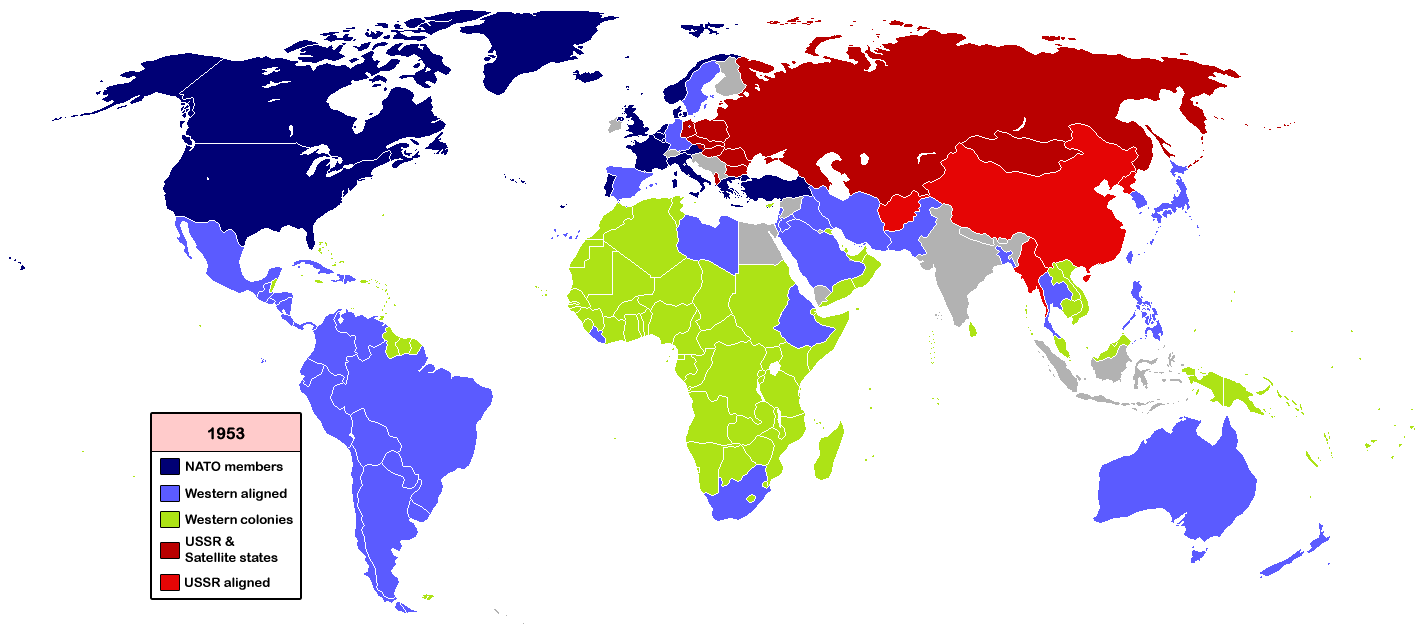
A map of the geopolitical situation in 1953

Eisenhower's 1957 foreign policy team

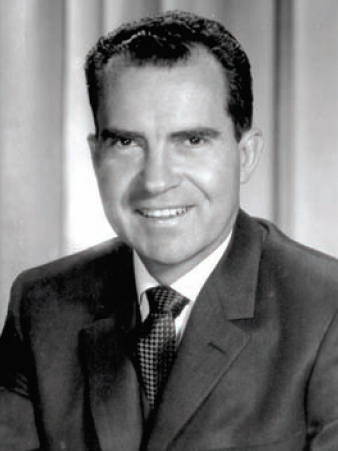
Richard Nixon

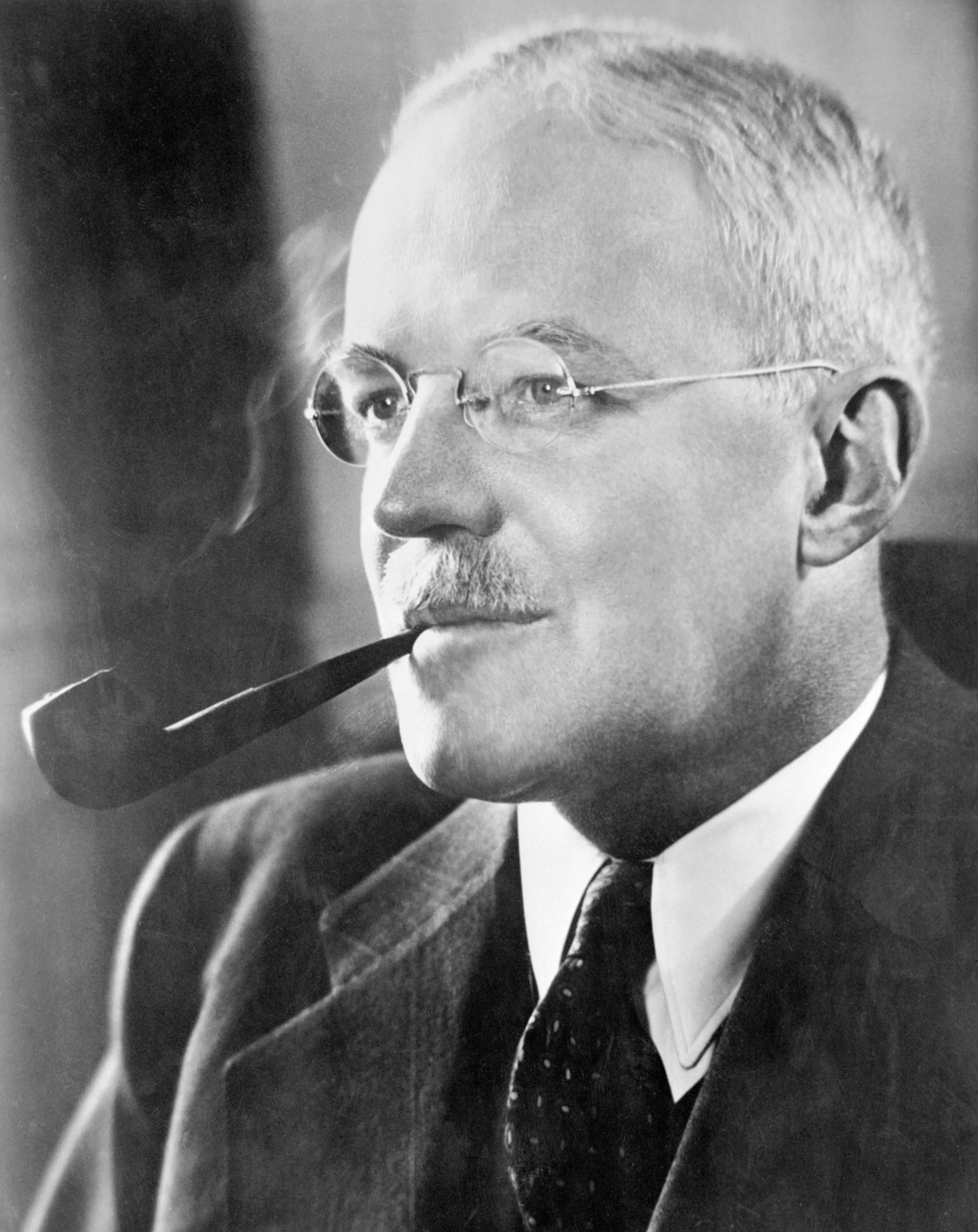
Allen W. Dulles

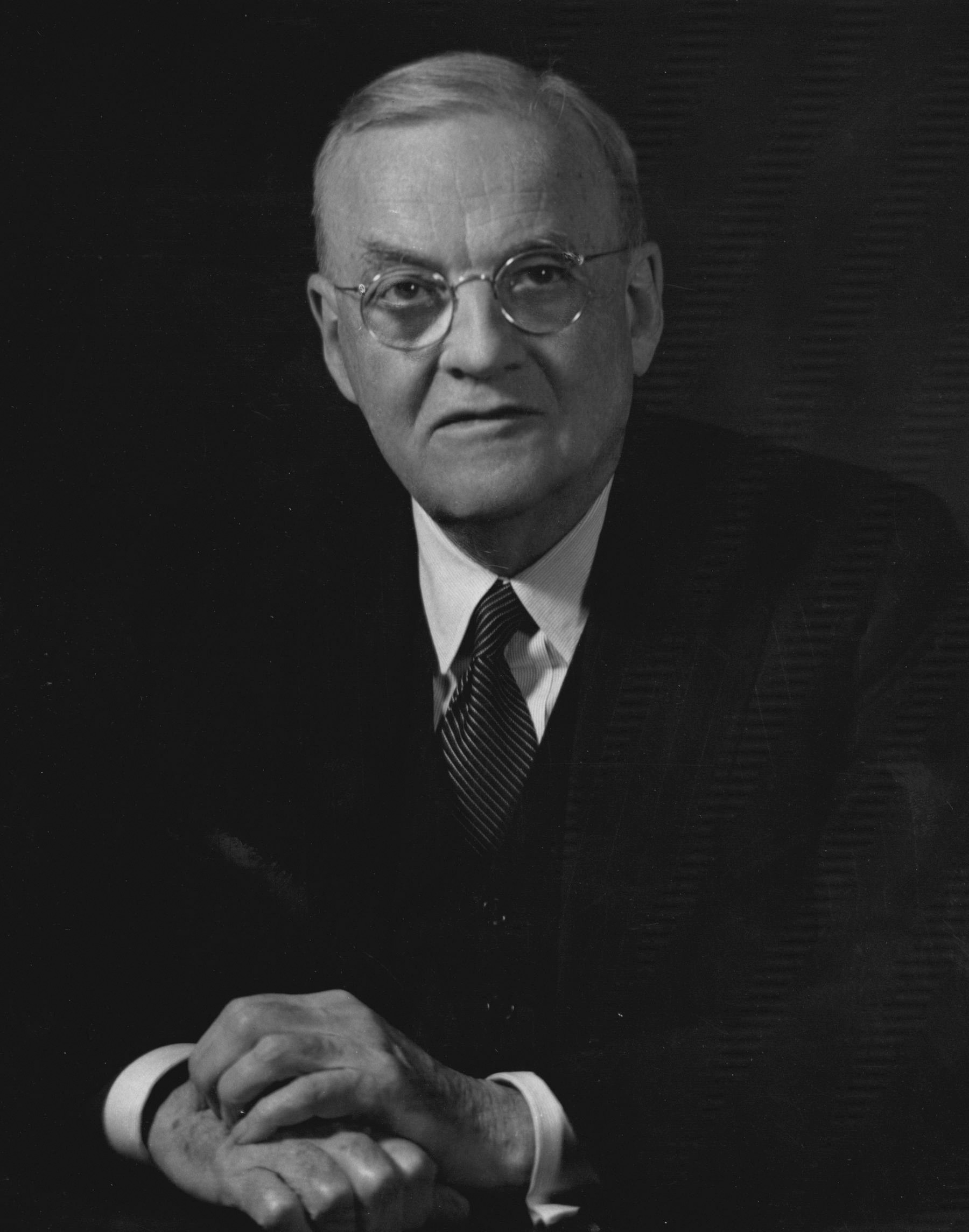
John Foster Dulles

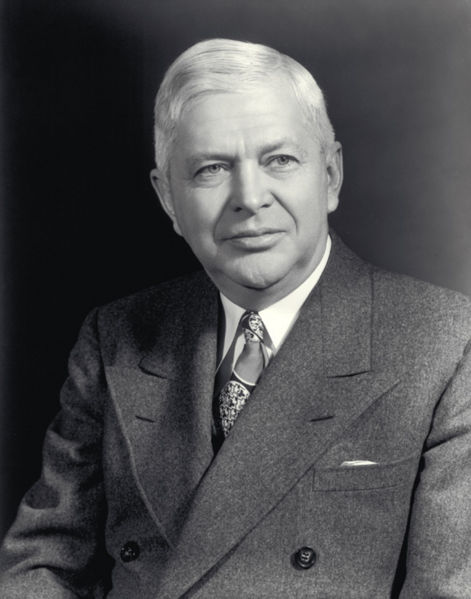
Charles Erwin Wilson

Eisenhower's 1952 candidacy was motivated in large part by his opposition to Taft's isolationist views; he did not share Taft's concerns regarding U.S. involvement in collective security and international trade, the latter of which was embodied by the 1947 General Agreement on Tariffs and Trade. After Eisenhower secured the 1952 nomination, he and Taft agreed that Taft would handle domestic issues in his role as Senate GOP leader and Eisenhower would control foreign policy.

The Cold War dominated international politics in the 1950s. As both the United States and the Soviet Union possessed nuclear weapons, any conflict presented the risk of escalation into nuclear warfare. Eisenhower continued the basic Truman administration policy of containment of Soviet expansion and the strengthening of the economies of Western Europe. Eisenhower's overall Cold War policy was described by NSC 174, which held that the rollback of Soviet influence was a long-term goal, but that the United States would not provoke war with the Soviet Union. He planned for the full mobilization of the country to counter Soviet power, and emphasized making a "public effort to explain to the American people why such a militaristic mobilization of their society was needed."

After Joseph Stalin died in March 1953, Georgy Malenkov took leadership of the Soviet Union. Malenkov proposed a "peaceful coexistence" with the West, and British Prime Minister Winston Churchill proposed a summit of the world leaders. Fearing that the summit would delay the rearmament of West Germany, and skeptical of Malenkov's intentions and ability to stay in power, the Eisenhower administration nixed the summit idea. In April 1953, Eisenhower delivered his "Chance for Peace speech", in which he called for an armistice in Korea, free elections to re-unify Germany, the "full independence" of Eastern European nations, and United Nations control of atomic energy. Though well received in the West, the Soviet leadership viewed Eisenhower's speech as little more than propaganda. In 1954, a more confrontational leader, Nikita Khrushchev, took charge in the Soviet Union. Eisenhower became increasingly skeptical of the possibility of cooperation with the Soviet Union after it refused to support his Atoms for Peace proposal, which called for the creation of the International Atomic Energy Agency and the creation of nuclear power plants.

=== National security policy ===
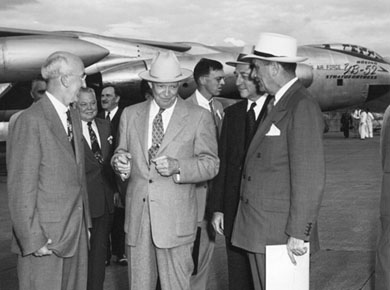
Eisenhower and members of his Cabinet inspect the YB-52 prototype of the B-52, c.1954

Eisenhower unveiled the New Look, his first national security policy, on October 30, 1953. It reflected his concern for balancing the Cold War military commitments of the United States with the nation's financial resources. The policy emphasized reliance on strategic nuclear weapons, rather than much more expensive conventional military power. His goal was to deter both conventional and nuclear military threats. The U.S. military developed a strategy of nuclear deterrence based upon the triad of land-based intercontinental ballistic missiles (ICBMs), strategic bombers, and submarine-launched ballistic missiles (SLBMs). Throughout his presidency, Eisenhower insisted on having plans to retaliate, fight, and win a nuclear war against the Soviets, although he hoped he would never feel forced to use such weapons.

As the ground war in Korea ended, Eisenhower sharply reduced the reliance on expensive Army divisions. Historian Saki Dockrill argues that his long-term strategy was to promote the collective security of NATO and other American allies, strengthen the Third World against Soviet pressures, avoid another Korea, and produce a climate that would slowly and steadily weaken Soviet power and influence. Dockrill points to Eisenhower's use of multiple assets against the Soviet Union:

Eisenhower knew that the United States had many other assets that could be translated into influence over the Soviet bloc—its democratic values and institutions, its rich and competitive capitalist economy, its intelligence technology and skills in obtaining information as to the enemy's capabilities and intentions, its psychological warfare and covert operations capabilities, its negotiating skills, and its economic and military assistance to the Third World.

== End of the Korean War ==
During his campaign, Eisenhower said he would go to Korea to end the Korean War, which had broken out in 1950 after North Korea invaded South Korea. The U.S. had joined the war to prevent the fall of South Korea, later expanding the mission to include victory over the Communist regime in North Korea. The intervention of Chinese forces in late 1950 led to a protracted stalemate around the 38th parallel with continuous casualties. ` Truman had begun peace talks in mid-1951, but the issue of North Korean and Chinese prisoners remained a sticking point. Over 40,000 prisoners from the two countries refused repatriation, but North Korea and China nonetheless demanded their return. Upon taking office, Eisenhower demanded a solution, warning China that he would use nuclear weapons if the war continued. China came to terms, and an armistice was signed on July 27, 1953, as the Korean Armistice Agreement. Historian Edward C. Keefer said that in accepting the American demands that POWs could refuse to return to their home country, "China and North Korea still swallowed the bitter pill, probably forced down in part by the atomic ultimatum." Historian and government advisor McGeorge Bundy stated that while the threat to use nuclear weapons was not empty, neither did it ever reach the point of trying to obtain consent to their use from U.S. allies.

The armistice led to decades of uneasy peace between North Korea and South Korea. The United States and South Korea signed a defensive treaty in October 1953, and the U.S. continue to the present day to station thousands of soldiers in South Korea.

== Covert actions ==
Eisenhower, while accepting the doctrine of containment, sought to counter the Soviet Union through more active means as detailed in the State-Defense report NSC 68. The Eisenhower administration and the Central Intelligence Agency used covert action to interfere with suspected communist governments abroad. An early use of covert action was against the elected Prime Minister of Iran, Mohammed Mosaddeq, resulting in the 1953 Iranian coup d'état. The CIA also instigated the 1954 Guatemalan coup d'état by the local military that overthrew president Jacobo Arbenz Guzmán, whom U.S. officials viewed as too friendly toward the Soviet Union. Critics have produced conspiracy theories about the causal factors, but according to historian Stephen M. Streeter, CIA documents show the United Fruit Company (UFCO) played no major role in Eisenhower's decision, that the Eisenhower administration did not need to be forced into the action by any lobby groups, and that Soviet influence in Guatemala was minimal.

Eisenhower's covert operations were not limited to the Western Hemisphere. He also broke new ground in Africa when he ordered the assassination of Patrice Lumumba, the first Prime Minister of the Democratic Republic of the Congo following Lumumba's visit to the United States requesting assistance against Belgian violence and resistance to Congolese independence. This was the first time the United States had ordered the assassination of a foreign leader.

Streeter identifies three major interpretive perspectives, "Realist", "Revisionist", and "Post-revisionist":

Realists, who concern themselves primarily with power politics, have generally blamed the Cold War on an aggressive, expansionist Soviet empire. Because realists believe that Arbenz was a Soviet puppet, they view his overthrow as the necessary rollback of communism in the Western Hemisphere. Revisionists, who place the majority of the blame for the Cold War on the United States, emphasize how Washington sought to expand overseas markets and promote foreign investment, especially in the Third World. Revisionists allege that because the State Department came to the rescue of the UFCO, the U.S. intervention in Guatemala represents a prime example of economic imperialism. Post-revisionists, a difficult group to define precisely, incorporate both strategic and economic factors in their interpretation of the Cold War. They tend to agree with revisionists on the issue of Soviet responsibility, but they are much more concerned with explaining the cultural and ideological influences that warped Washington's perception of the Communist threat. According to postrevisionists, the Eisenhower administration officials turned against Arbenz because they failed to grasp that he represented a nationalist rather than a communist.

== Defeating the Bricker Amendment ==
In January 1953, Republican Senator John W. Bricker of Ohio re-introduced the Bricker Amendment, which would limit the president's treaty making power and ability to enter into executive agreements with foreign nations. Conservatives feared that the United Nations would become a world government, and that the steady stream of post-World War II-era international treaties and executive agreements were undermining the nation's sovereignty. Believing that the amendment would weaken the president and make it much harder to exercise leadership on the global stage, Eisenhower worked with the Democrats led by Senate Minority Leader Lyndon B. Johnson to defeat Bricker's proposal. Although the amendment started out with 56 Senate co-sponsors, it went down to defeat in 1954 on 42–50 vote. Later in 1954, a watered-down version of the amendment missed the required two-thirds majority in the Senate by one vote. This episode proved to be the last hurrah for the isolationist Republicans, as younger conservatives increasingly turned to an internationalism based on aggressive anti-communism, typified by Senator Barry Goldwater.

== Europe ==
Eisenhower sought troop reductions in Europe by sharing of defense responsibilities with NATO allies. Europeans, however, never quite trusted the idea of nuclear deterrence and were reluctant to shift away from NATO into a proposed European Defence Community (EDC). Like Truman, Eisenhower believed that the rearmament of West Germany was vital to NATO's strategic interests. The administration backed an arrangement, devised by Churchill and British Foreign Minister Anthony Eden, in which West Germany was rearmed and became a fully sovereign member of NATO in return for promises not to establish atomic, biological, or chemical weapons programs. European leaders also created the Western European Union to coordinate European defense. In response to the integration of West Germany into NATO, Eastern bloc leaders established the Warsaw Pact. Austria, which had been jointly-occupied by the Soviet Union and the Western powers, regained its sovereignty with the 1955 Austrian State Treaty. As part of the arrangement that ended the occupation, Austria declared its neutrality after gaining independence.

The Eisenhower administration placed a high priority on undermining Soviet influence on Eastern Europe, and escalated a propaganda war under the leadership of Charles Douglas Jackson. The United States dropped over 300,000 propaganda leaflets in Eastern Europe between 1951 and 1956, and Radio Free Europe sent broadcasts throughout the region. A 1953 uprising in East Germany briefly stoked the administration's hopes of a decline in Soviet influence, but the USSR quickly crushed the insurrection. In 1956, a major uprising broke out in Hungary. After Hungarian leader Imre Nagy promised the establishment of a multiparty democracy and withdrawal from the Warsaw Pact, Soviet leader Nikita Khrushchev dispatched 60,000 soldiers into Hungary to crush the rebellion. The United States strongly condemned the military response and Eisenhower "sent an appeal" to then Soviet premier Nikolai Bulganin calling on the withdrawal of Soviet forces. The perceived mild move disappointed many Hungarian revolutionaries. After the revolution, the US shifted from encouraging revolt to seeking cultural and economic ties as a means of undermining Communist regimes. Among the administration's cultural diplomacy initiatives were continuous goodwill tours by the "soldier-musician ambassadors" of the Seventh Army Symphony Orchestra.

In 1958, Dulles signed the Mutual Defence Agreement with the United Kingdom.

=== Spain and Italy ===
In 1953, Eisenhower opened relations with Spain under dictator Francisco Franco. Liberals, remembering their bitter defeat by Franco in 1939, demanded Spain be isolated. However Spain had a strategic geography and a strong anti-communist position. Therefore Eisenhower built a trade and military alliance with the Spanish through the Pact of Madrid. These relations brought an end to Spain's isolation, which in turn led to a Spanish economic boom known as the Spanish miracle.

One of Eisenhower's most visible diplomatic appointments was Clare Boothe Luce, who served as the ambassador to Italy from 1953 to 1956. She was a famous playwright, prominent American Catholic, and the wife of Henry Luce, the dynamic publisher of the highly influential Time and Life magazines. Her mission was to give a favorable impression of the United States to the Italians and help defeat communism in that country. Luce's frontal attack on communist power, while often counterproductive, was also balanced by her discerning use of diplomacy, which deeply influenced the interplay between Italy's domestic and foreign policies. She promoted American popular culture and critically evaluated its effects. She often met with political and cultural leaders who demanded autonomy and mildly criticized American culture.

In 1958,

== East Asia and Southeast Asia ==
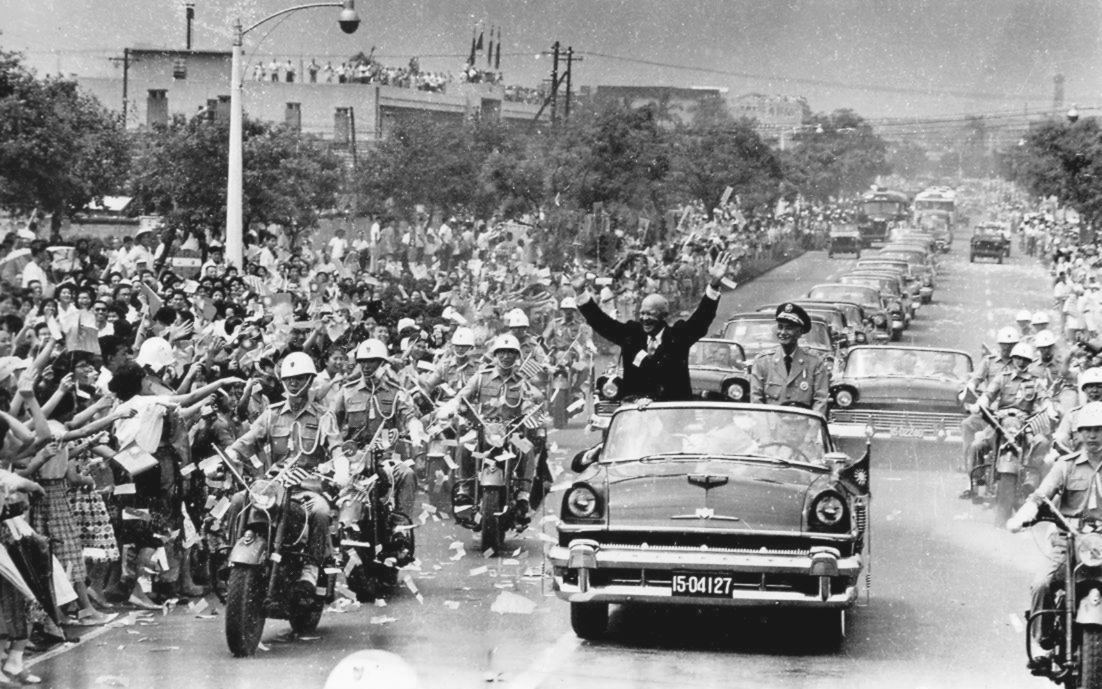
With Republic of China President Chiang Kai-shek, Eisenhower waved to Taiwanese people during his visit to Taipei, Taiwan in June 1960.

After the end of World War II, the Communist Việt Minh launched an insurrection against the French colony called State of Vietnam. Seeking to bolster France as a NATO ally and prevent the fall of Vietnam to Communism, the Truman and Eisenhower administrations played a major role in financing French military operations in Vietnam. In 1954, the French requested the United States to intervene in the Battle of Dien Bien Phu, which would prove to be the climactic battle of the First Indochina War. Seeking to rally public support for the intervention, Eisenhower articulated the domino theory, which held that the fall of Vietnam could lead to the fall of other countries. As France refused to commit to granting independence to Vietnam, Congress refused to approve of an intervention in Vietnam, and the French were defeated at Dien Bien Phu. At the 1954 Geneva Conference, Dulles convinced Chinese and Soviet leaders to pressure Viet Minh leaders to accept the partition of Vietnam; the country was divided into a Communist northern half (under the leadership of Ho Chi Minh) and a non-Communist southern half (under the leadership of Ngo Dinh Diem). Despite some doubts about the strength of Diem's government, the Eisenhower administration directed aid to South Vietnam in hopes of creating a bulwark against further Communist expansion. With Eisenhower's approval, Diem refused to hold elections to re-unify Vietnam; those elections had been scheduled for 1956 as part of the agreement at the Geneva Conference.

Eisenhower's commitment in South Vietnam was part of a broader program to contain China and the Soviet Union in East Asia. In 1954, the United States and seven other countries created the Southeast Asia Treaty Organization (SEATO), a defensive alliance dedicated to preventing the spread of Communism in Southeast Asia. In 1954, China began shelling tiny islands off the coast of Mainland China which were controlled by the Republic of China (ROC). The shelling nearly escalated to nuclear war as Eisenhower considered using nuclear weapons to prevent the invasion of Taiwan, the main island controlled by the ROC. The crisis ended when China ended the shelling and both sides agreed to diplomatic talks; a second crisis in 1958 would end in a similar fashion. During the first crisis, the United States and the ROC signed the Sino-American Mutual Defense Treaty, which committed the United States to the defense of Taiwan. The CIA also supported dissidents in the 1959 Tibetan uprising, but China crushed the uprising.

== Middle East ==
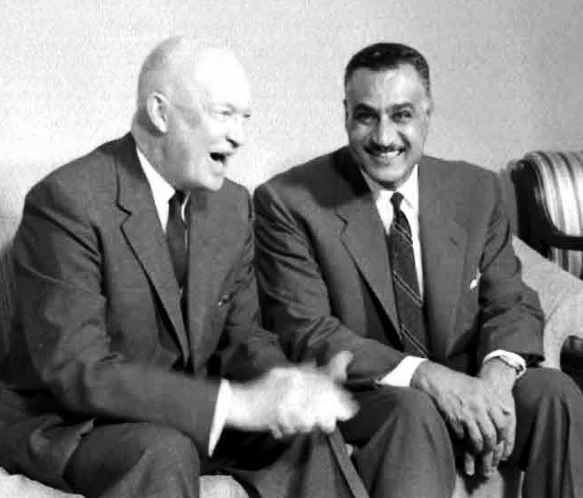
Eisenhower meeting with Egyptian President Gamal Abdel Nasser during Nasser's visit to United Nations in New York, September 1960

The Middle East became increasingly important to foreign policy during the 1950s. After the 1953 Iranian coup, the U.S. supplanted Britain as the most influential ally of Iran. Eisenhower encouraged the creation of the Baghdad Pact, a military alliance consisting of Turkey, Iran, Iraq, and Pakistan. It had little impact. As it did in several other regions, the Eisenhower administration sought to establish stable, friendly, anti-Communist regimes in the Arab World. The U.S. attempted to mediate the Israeli–Palestinian conflict, but Israel's unwillingness to give up its gains from the 1948 Arab–Israeli War and Arab hostility towards Israel prevented any agreement.

=== Suez crisis ===
President Eisenhower press conference about the Suez crisis, August 9, 1956

In 1952, a revolution led by Gamal Abdel Nasser had overthrown the pro-British Egyptian government. After taking power in 1954, Nasser played the Soviet Union and the United States against each other, seeking aid from both sides. Eisenhower sought to bring Nasser into the American sphere of influence through economic aid, but Nasser's Arab nationalism and opposition to Israel served as a source of friction between the United States and Egypt. One of Nasser's main goals was the construction of the Aswan Dam, which would provide immense hydroelectric power and help irrigate much of Egypt. Eisenhower attempted to use American aid for the financing of the construction of the dam as leverage for other areas of foreign policy, but aid negotiations collapsed. In July 1956, just a week after the collapse of the aid negotiations, Nasser nationalized the British-run Suez Canal, sparking the Suez Crisis.

The British strongly protested the nationalization, and formed a plan with France and Israel to capture the canal. Eisenhower strongly opposed military intervention, and he repeatedly and explicitly warned British Prime Minister Anthony Eden that the U.S. would not tolerate an invasion. Eisenhower feared that a military intervention would alienate Middle Eastern countries from the West and to the Soviet Union. Israel attacked Egypt in October 1956, quickly seizing control of the Sinai Peninsula. France and Britain launched air and naval attacks after Nasser refused to renounce Egypt's nationalization of the canal. Nasser responded by sinking dozens of ships, preventing operation of the canal. Angered by the attacks, which risked sending Arab states into the arms of the Soviet Union, the Eisenhower administration demanded a cease fire and used heavy economic pressure to force France and Britain to withdraw. The incident marked the end of British and French dominance in the Middle East and opened the way for greater American involvement in the region. Later, Eisenhower used economic sanctions to coerce Israel into withdrawing from the Sinai Peninsula, and the Suez Canal resumed operations under the control of Egypt.

=== Eisenhower Doctrine ===
In response to the power vacuum in the Middle East following the Suez Crisis, the Eisenhower administration developed a new policy designed to stabilize the region against Soviet threats or internal turmoil. Given the collapse of British prestige and the rise of Soviet interest in the region, the president informed Congress on January 5, 1957, that it was essential for the U.S. to accept new responsibilities for the security of the Middle East. Under the policy, known as the Eisenhower Doctrine, any Middle Eastern country could request American economic assistance or aid from U.S. military forces if it was being threatened by armed aggression. Though Eisenhower found it difficult to convince leading Arab states or Israel to endorse the doctrine, but he applied the new doctrine by dispensing economic aid to shore up the Kingdom of Jordan, encouraging Syria's neighbors to consider military operations against it, and sending U.S. troops into Lebanon to prevent a radical revolution from sweeping over that country. The troops sent to Lebanon never saw any fighting, but the deployment marked the only time during Eisenhower's presidency when troops were sent abroad into a potential combat situation.

Though U.S. aid helped Lebanon and Jordan avoid revolution, the Eisenhower doctrine enhanced Nasser's prestige as the preeminent Arab nationalist. Partly as a result of the bungled U.S. intervention in Syria, Nasser established the short-lived United Arab Republic, a political union between Egypt and Syria. The U.S. also lost a sympathetic Middle Eastern government due to the 1958 Iraqi coup d'état, which saw King Faisal I replaced by General Abd al-Karim Qasim as the leader of Iraq.

== South Asia: India vs. Pakistan ==
The 1947 partition of British India created two new independent states, India and Pakistan. Indian Prime Minister Jawaharlal Nehru pursued a non-aligned policy in the Cold War, and frequently criticized U.S. policies. Largely out of a desire to build up military strength against the more populous India, Pakistan sought close relations with the United States, joining both the Baghdad Pact and SEATO. This U.S.–Pakistan alliance alienated India from the United States, causing India to move towards the Soviet Union. In the late 1950s, the Eisenhower administration sought closer relations with India, sending aid to stem the 1957 Indian economic crisis. By the end of his administration, relations between the United States and India had moderately improved, but Pakistan remained the main U.S. ally in South Asia.

In terms of rhetoric, Nehru—as both prime minister and foreign minister (1947–1964), promoted a moralistic rhetoric attacking both the Soviet bloc and the U.S. and its bloc. Nehru tried to build a nonaligned movement, paying special attention to the many new nations in the Third World released from European colonial status at this time. Despite rhetoric that criticized both Cold War blocs, India solicited and received foreign assistance from both the Soviet Union and the United States during its Second Five-Year Plan (1956–1961), aimed at developing India's economy. Eisenhower and Dulles themselves used moralistic rhetoric to attack the evils of Communism. To ease the tensions Eisenhower sent John Sherman Cooper as ambassador in 1956–1957. Cooper got along very well with Nehru.

In 1959, Eisenhower made a state visit to India. He was so supportive that The New York Times remarked, "It did not seem to matter much whether Nehru had actually requested or been given a guarantee that the US would help India to meet further Chinese Communist aggression. What mattered was the obvious strengthening of Indian–American friendship to a point where no such guarantee was necessary."

== Latin America ==
For much of his administration, Eisenhower largely continued the policy of his predecessors in Latin America, supporting U.S.-friendly governments regardless of whether they held power through authoritarian means. The Eisenhower administration expanded military aid to Latin America, and used Pan-Americanism as a tool to prevent the spread of Soviet influence. In the late 1950s, several Latin American governments fell, partly due to a recession in the United States.

Cuba was particularly close to the United States, and 300,000 American tourists visited Cuba each year in the late 1950s. The Cuban military dictator, Fulgencio Batista, sought close ties with both the U.S. government and major U.S. companies, and American organized crime also had a strong presence in Cuba. The US government provided arms, money and its authority to the Batista dictatorship. In January 1959, the Cuban Revolution ousted Batista. The new government, led by Fidel Castro, quickly legalized the Communist Party of Cuba, sparking U.S. fears that Castro would align with the Soviet Union. When Castro visited the United States in April 1959, Eisenhower refused to meet with him, delegating the task to Nixon.

Eisenhower approved an operation by the CIA in which they recruited operatives in Cuba to carry out an extensive campaign of terrorist attacks and sabotage, kill civilians, and cause economic damage. The CIA also trained and commanded pilots to bomb civilian airfields. During this period, the United States government sought to promote private enterprise as an instrument for advancing US strategic interests in the developing world. As Castro drew closer to the Soviet Union, the U.S. broke diplomatic relations, launched a near-total embargo, and began preparations for an invasion of Cuba by Cuban expatriates armed and funded by the CIA.

In June 1954 the Eisenhower Administration launched Operation Wetback; an immigration law enforcement initiative created by Joseph Swing who was the head of the United States Immigration and Naturalization Service (INS). The program itself was implemented by U.S. Attorney General Herbert Brownell to stop illegal immigration.

== Ballistic missiles and arms control ==
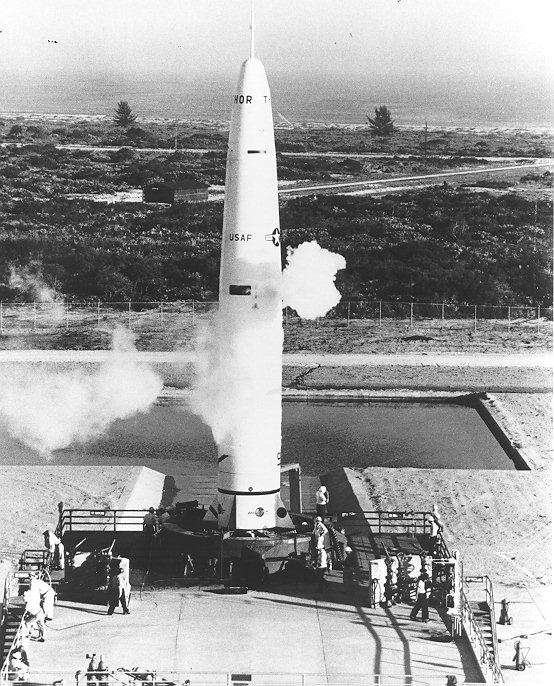
First test launch of the PGM-17 Thor from Cape Canaveral Launch Complex 17B, January 25, 1957

The United States had the first atom bombs in 1945; the USSR caught up by the late 1940s, but lagged in long-distance delivery systems. Both sides started building large nuclear stockpiles during the 1950s. During Eisenhower's presidency, the Cold War arms race shifted from nuclear weapons to delivery systems, with the U.S. starting with a large lead in very long-range bombers. The Soviets emphasized building intercontinental ballistic missiles (ICBMs). They fired their first ICBM in August 1957, followed by a highly public launching of the Sputnik 1 satellite in October 1957. The launch of the Sputnik energized the American missile program, and the U.S. fired its first ICBM in December 1957. The U.S. brought Titan and Atlas ICBMs into service in 1959, and in 1960 built Polaris submarines capable of underwater launches.

In January 1956 the United States Air Force began developing the Thor, a 1,500 miles (2,400 km) Intermediate-range ballistic missile. The program proceeded quickly, and beginning in 1958 the first of 20 Royal Air Force Thor squadrons became operational in the United Kingdom. This was the first experiment at sharing strategic nuclear weapons in NATO and led to other placements abroad of American nuclear weapons. Critics at the time, led by Democratic Senator John F. Kennedy levied charges to the effect that there was a "missile gap", that is, the U.S. had fallen militarily behind the Soviets because of their lead in space. Historians now discount those allegations, although they agree that Eisenhower did not effectively respond to his critics. In fact, the Soviet Union did not deploy ICBMs until after Eisenhower left office, and the U.S. retained an overall advantage in nuclear weaponry. Eisenhower was aware of the American advantage in ICBM development because of intelligence gathered by U-2 planes, which had begun flying over the Soviet Union in 1956.

The administration decided the best way to minimize the proliferation of nuclear weapons was to tightly control knowledge of gas-centrifuge technology, which was essential to turn ordinary uranium and to weapons-grade uranium. American diplomats by 1960 reached agreement with the German, Dutch, and British governments to limit access to the technology. The four-power understanding on gas-centrifuge secrecy would last until 1975, when scientist Abdul Qadeer Khan took the Dutch centrifuge technology to Pakistan.

France also sought American help in developing nuclear weapons; Eisenhower rejected the overtures for four reasons. Before 1958, he was troubled by the political instability of the French Fourth Republic and worried that it might use nuclear weapons to its colonial wars in Vietnam and Algeria. De Gaulle brought stability to the Fifth Republic in 1958, but Eisenhower knew him too well from the war years. De Gaulle wanted to challenge the Anglo-Saxon monopoly on Western weapons. Eisenhower feared his grandiose plans to use the bombs to restore French grandeur would weaken NATO. Furthermore, Eisenhower wanted to discourage the proliferation of nuclear arms anywhere.

== U-2 Crisis ==
U.S. and Soviet leaders met at the 1955 Geneva Summit, the first summit since the 1945 Potsdam Conference. No progress was made on major issues; the two sides had major differences on German policy, and the Soviets dismissed Eisenhower's "Open Skies" proposal. Nevertheless, the conference marked the start of a minor thaw in Cold War relations. Khrushchev toured the United States in 1959, and he and Eisenhower conducted high-level talks regarding nuclear disarmament and the status of Berlin. Eisenhower wanted limits on nuclear weapons testing and on-site inspections of nuclear weapons, while Khrushchev sought the total elimination of nuclear arsenals. Both wanted to limit total military spending and prevent nuclear proliferation, but Cold War tensions made negotiations difficult. Towards the end of his second term, Eisenhower was determined to reach a nuclear test ban treaty as part of an overall move towards détente with the Soviet Union. Khrushchev had also become increasingly interested in reaching an accord, partly due to the growing Sino-Soviet split. By 1960, the major unresolved issue was on-site inspections, as both sides sought nuclear test bans. Hopes for reaching a nuclear agreement at a May 1960 summit in Paris were derailed by the downing of an American U-2 spy plane over the Soviet Union.

The Eisenhower administration, initially thinking the pilot had died in the crash, authorized the release of a cover story claiming that the plane was a "weather research aircraft" which had unintentionally strayed into Soviet airspace after the pilot had radioed "difficulties with his oxygen equipment" while flying over Turkey. Further, Eisenhower said that his administration had not been spying on the Soviet Union; when the Soviets produced the pilot, Captain Francis Gary Powers, the Americans were caught misleading the public, and the incident resulted in international embarrassment for the United States. The Senate Foreign Relations Committee held a lengthy inquiry into the U-2 incident. During the Paris Summit, Eisenhower accused Khrushchev "of sabotaging this meeting, on which so much of the hopes of the world have rested". Later, Eisenhower stated the summit had been ruined because of that "stupid U-2 business".

== International trips ==
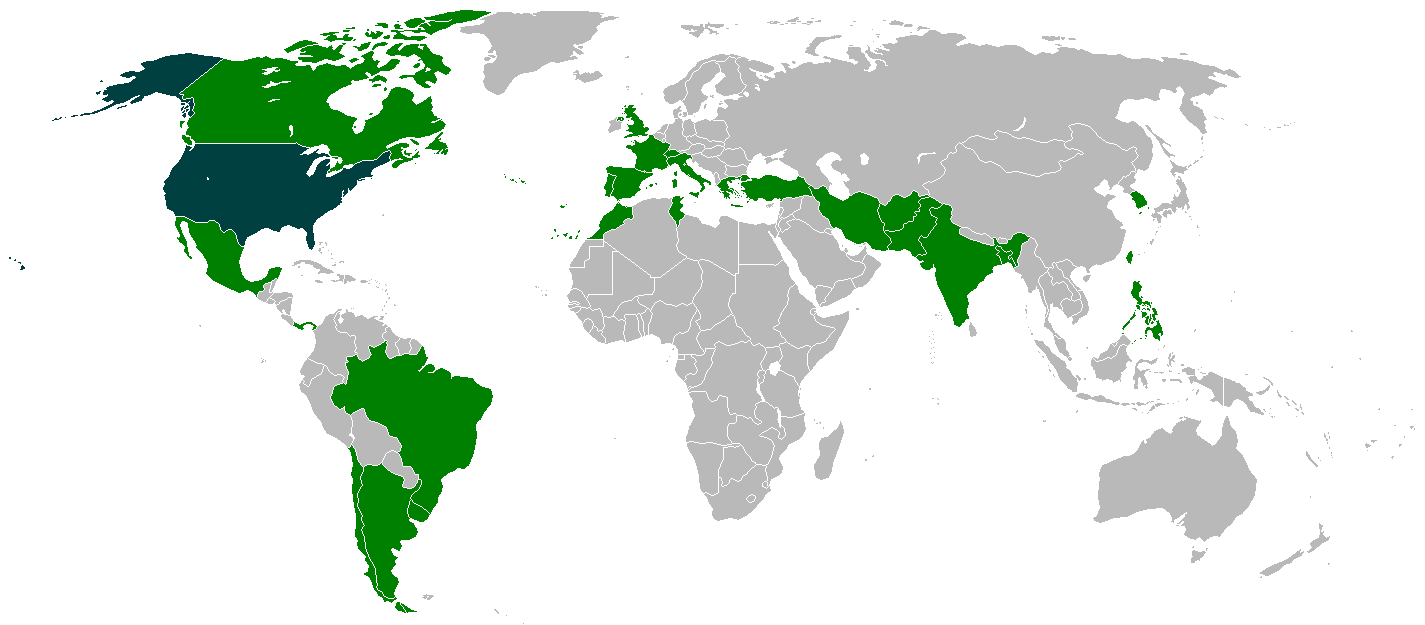
Countries visited by Eisenhower during his presidency.

Eisenhower made one international trip while president-elect, to South Korea, December 2–5, 1952; he visited Seoul and the Korean combat zone. He also made 16 international trips to 26 nations during his presidency. Between August 1959 and June 1960, he undertook five major tours, travelling to Europe, Southeast Asia, South America, the Middle East, and Southern Asia. On his "Flight to Peace" Goodwill tour, in December 1959, the President visited 11 nations including five in Asia, flying 22,000 miles in 19 days.

	Dates	Country	Locations	Details
1	December 2–5, 1952	South Korea	Seoul	Visit to Korean combat zone. (Visit made as President-elect.)
2	October 19, 1953	Mexico	Nueva Ciudad Guerrero	Dedication of Falcon Dam, with President Adolfo Ruiz Cortines.
3	November 13–15, 1953	Canada	Ottawa	State visit. Met with Governor General Vincent Massey and Prime Minister Louis St. Laurent. Addressed Parliament.
4	December 4–8, 1953	Bermuda	Hamilton	Attended the Bermuda Conference with Prime Minister Winston Churchill and French Prime Minister Joseph Laniel.
5	July 16–23, 1955	Switzerland	Geneva	Attended the Geneva Summit with British Prime Minister Anthony Eden, French Premier Edgar Faure and Soviet Premier Nikolai Bulganin.
6	July 21–23, 1956	Panama	Panama City	Attended the meeting of the presidents of the American republics.
7	March 20–24, 1957	Bermuda	Hamilton	Met with Prime Minister Harold Macmillan.
8	December 14–19, 1957	France	Paris	Attended the First NATO summit.
9	July 8–11, 1958	Canada	Ottawa	Informal visit. Met with Governor General Vincent Massey and Prime Minister John Diefenbaker. Addressed Parliament.
10	February 19–20, 1959	Mexico	Acapulco	Informal meeting with President Adolfo López Mateos.
11	June 26, 1959	Canada	Montreal	Joined Queen Elizabeth II in ceremony opening the St. Lawrence Seaway.
12	August 26–27, 1959	West Germany	Bonn	Informal meeting with Chancellor Konrad Adenauer and President Theodor Heuss.
12	August 27 – September 2, 1959	United Kingdom	London, Balmoral, Chequers	Informal visit. Met Prime Minister Harold Macmillan and Queen Elizabeth II.
12	September 2–4, 1959	France	Paris	Informal meeting with President Charles de Gaulle and Italian Prime Minister Antonio Segni. Addressed North Atlantic Council.
12	September 4–7, 1959	United Kingdom	Culzean Castle	Rested before returning to the United States.
13	December 4–6, 1959	Italy	Rome	Informal visit. Met with President Giovanni Gronchi.
13	December 6, 1959	Vatican City	Apostolic Palace	Audience with Pope John XXIII.
13	December 6–7, 1959	Turkey	Ankara	Informal visit. Met with President Celâl Bayar.
13	December 7–9, 1959	Pakistan	Karachi	Informal visit. Met with President Ayub Khan.
13	December 9, 1959	Afghanistan	Kabul	Informal visit. Met with King Mohammed Zahir Shah.
13	December 9–14, 1959	India	New Delhi, Agra	Met with President Rajendra Prasad and Prime Minister Jawaharlal Nehru. Addressed Parliament.
13	December 14, 1959	Iran	Tehran	Met with Shah Mohammad Reza Pahlavi. Addressed Parliament.
13	December 14–15, 1959	Greece	Athens	Official visit. Met with King Paul and Prime Minister Konstantinos Karamanlis. Addressed Parliament.
13	December 17, 1959	Tunisia	Tunis	Met with President Habib Bourguiba.
13	December 18–21, 1959	France	Toulon, Paris	Conference with President Charles de Gaulle, British Prime Minister Harold Macmillan and German Chancellor Konrad Adenauer.
13	December 21–22, 1959	Spain	Madrid	Met with Generalissimo Francisco Franco.
13	December 22, 1959	Morocco	Casablanca	Met with King Mohammed V.
14	February 23–26, 1960	Brazil	Brasília, Rio de Janeiro, São Paulo	Met with President Juscelino Kubitschek. Addressed Brazilian Congress.
14	February 26–29, 1960	Argentina	Buenos Aires, Mar del Plata, San Carlos de Bariloche	Met with President Arturo Frondizi.
14	February 29 – March 2, 1960	Chile	Santiago	Met with President Jorge Alessandri.
14	March 2–3, 1960	Uruguay	Montevideo	Met with President Benito Nardone. Returned to the U.S. via Buenos Aires and Suriname.
15	May 15–19, 1960	France	Paris	Conference with President Charles de Gaulle, British Prime Minister Harold Macmillan and Soviet Premier Nikita Khrushchev.
15	May 19–20, 1960	Portugal	Lisbon	Official visit. Met with President Américo Tomás.
16	June 14–16, 1960	Philippines	Manila	State visit. Met with President Carlos P. Garcia.
16	June 18–19, 1960	Republic of China (Formosa/Taiwan)	Taipei	State visit. Met with President Chiang Kai-shek.
16	June 19–20, 1960	South Korea	Seoul	Met with Prime Minister Heo Jeong. Addressed the National Assembly.
17	October 24, 1960	Mexico	Ciudad Acuña	Informal visit. Met with President Adolfo López Mateos.

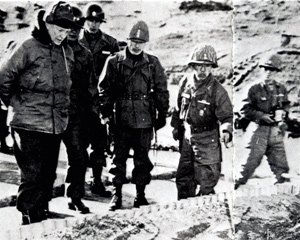
South Korea 1952

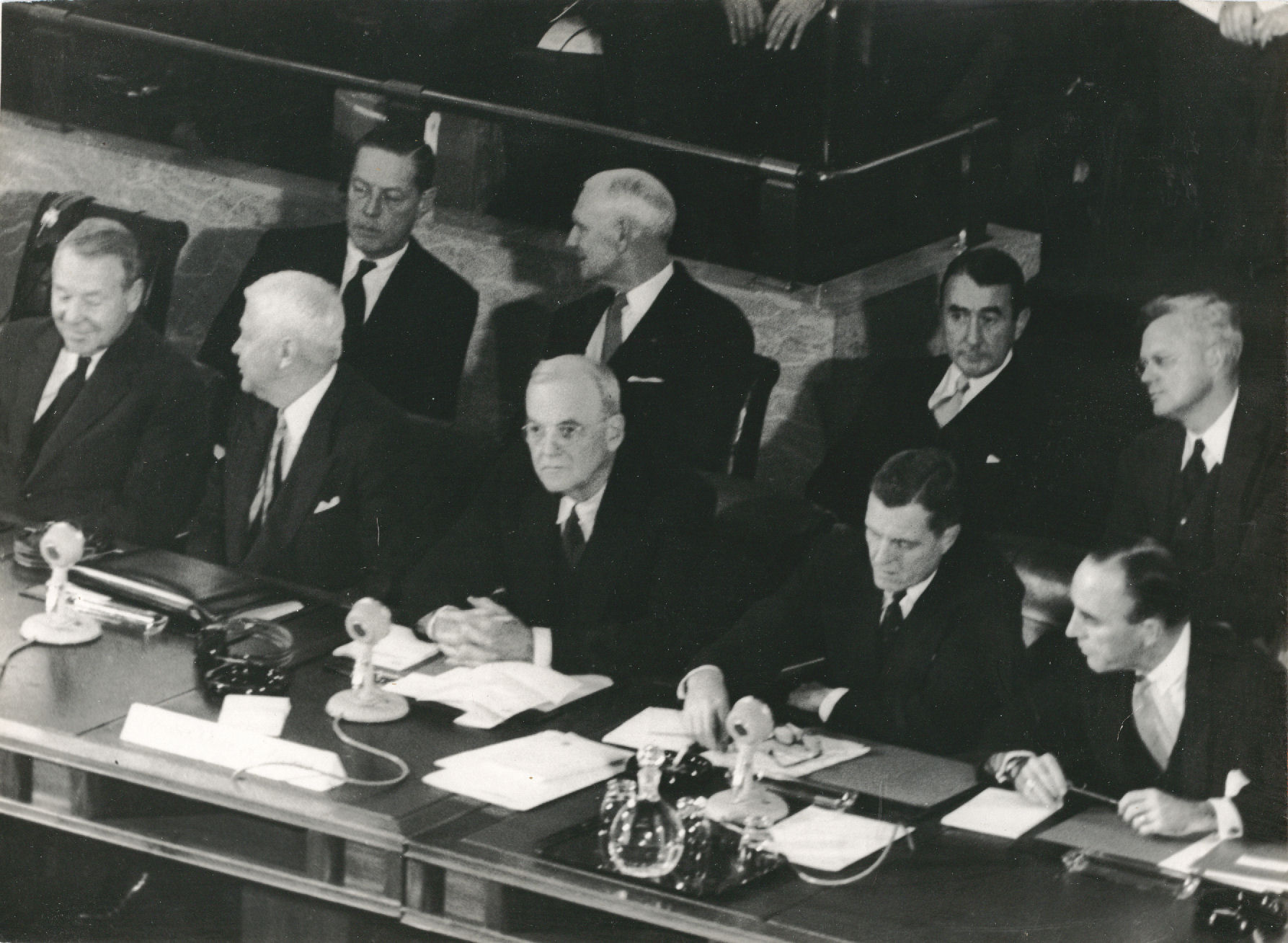
Geneva Summit 1955

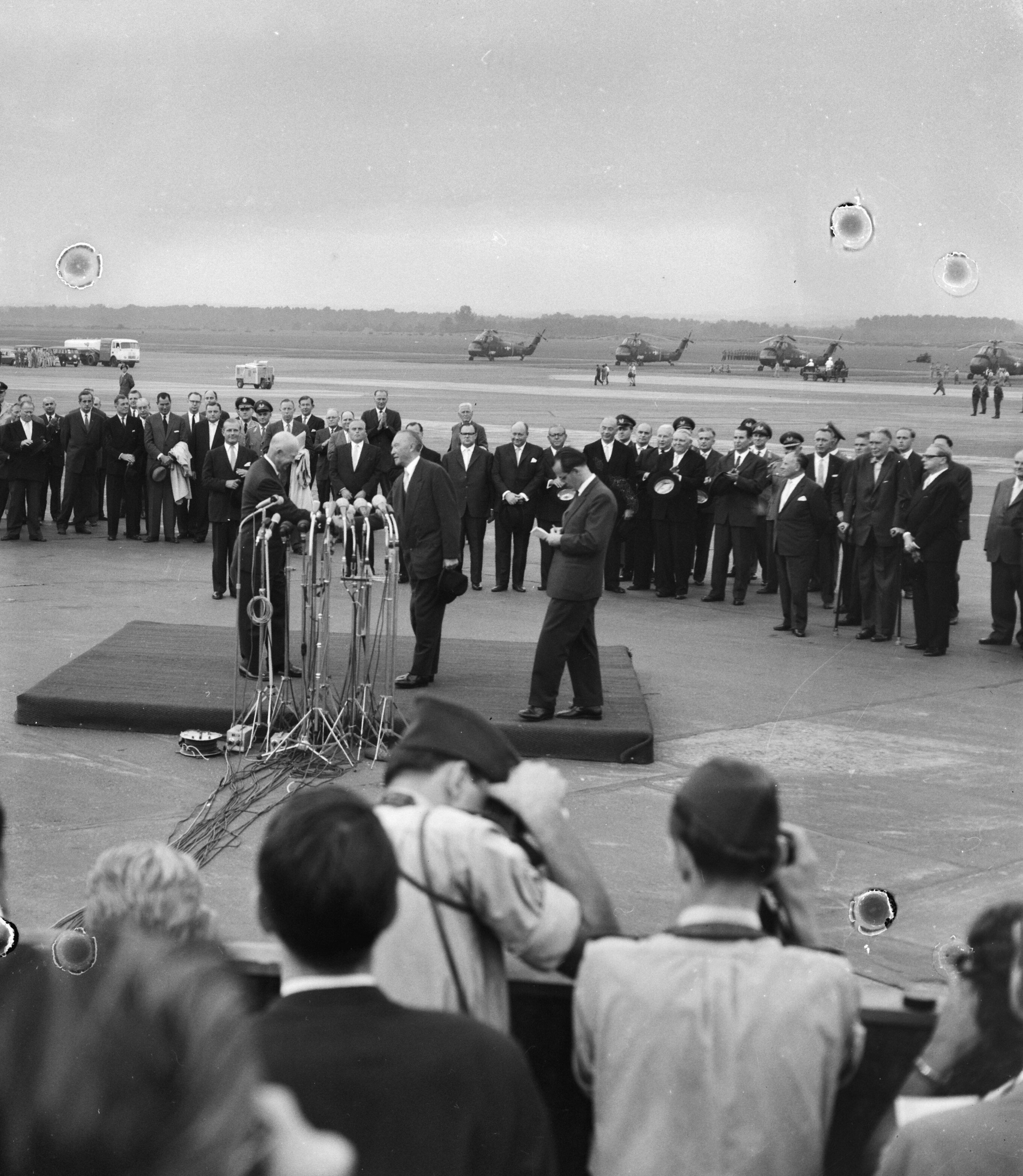
Bonn, Germany 1959

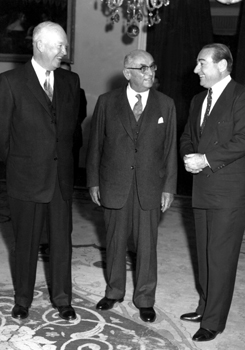
Turkey 1959

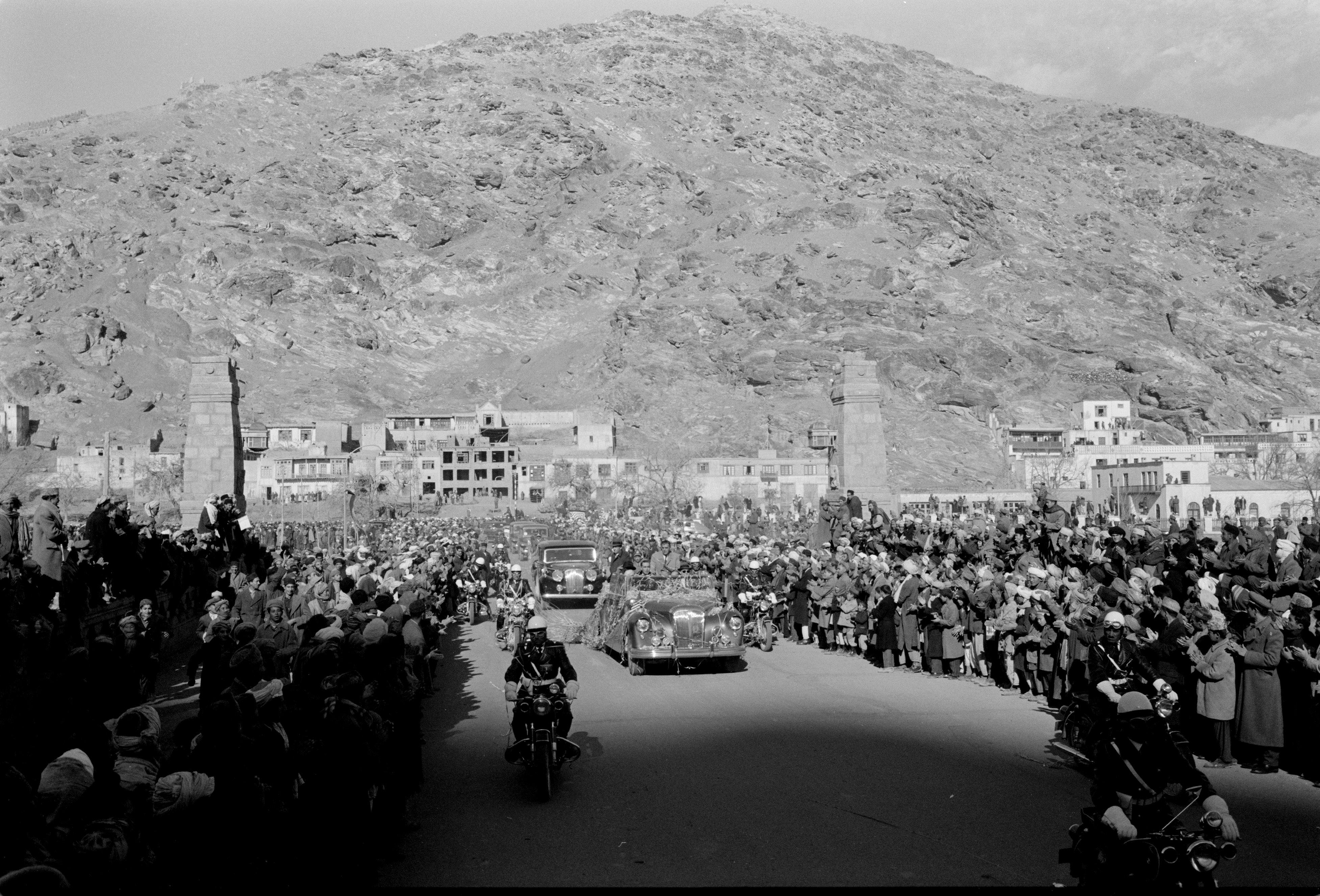
Afghanistan 1959

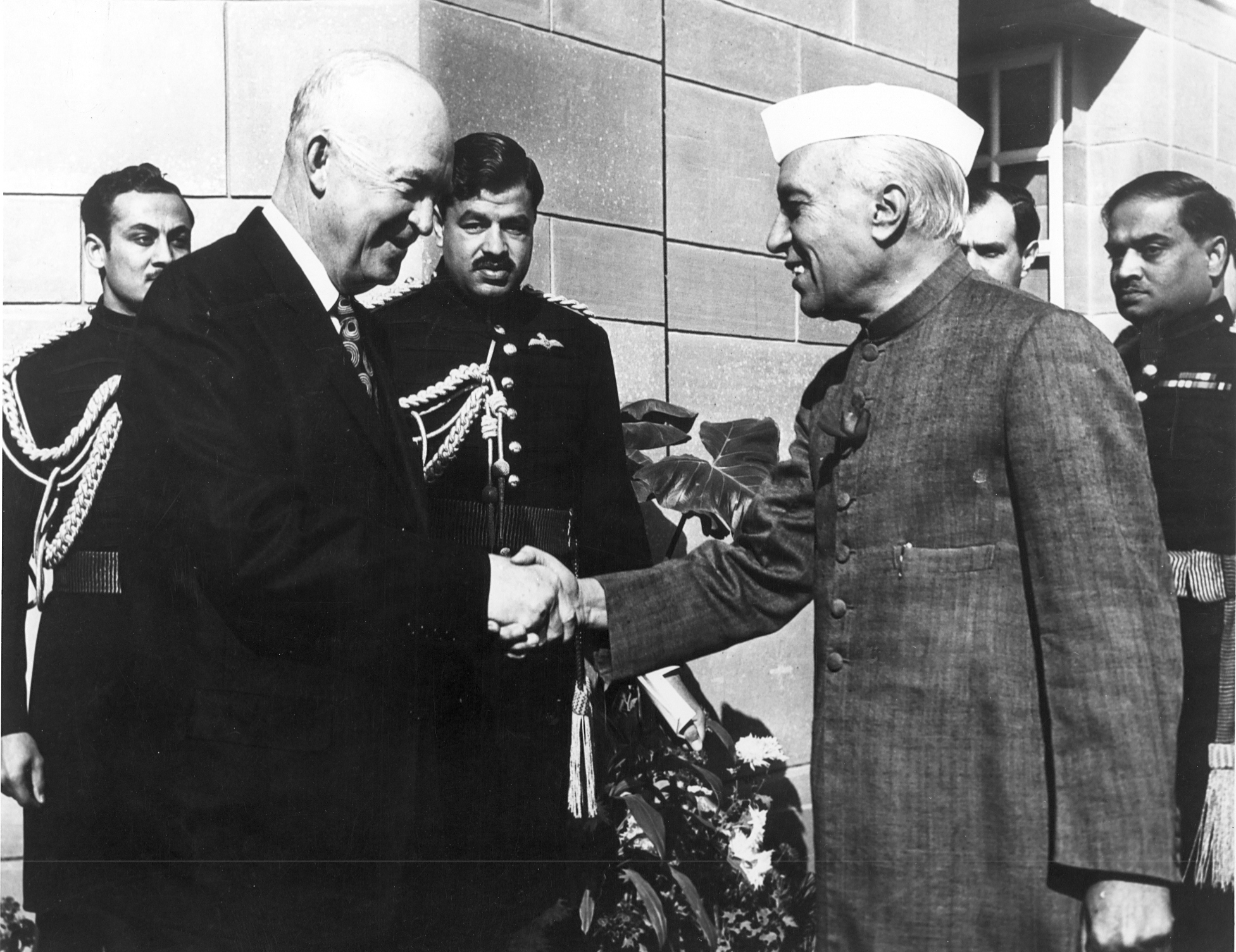
India 1959

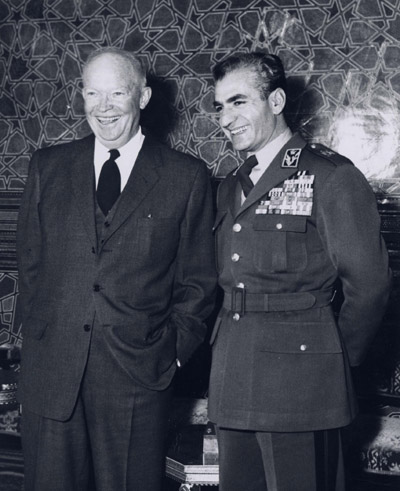
Iran 1959

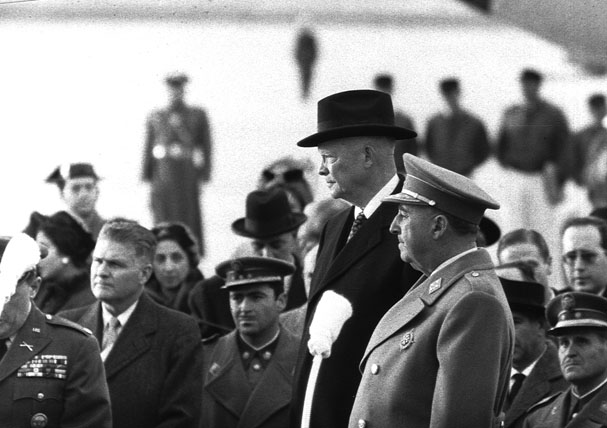
Spain 1959

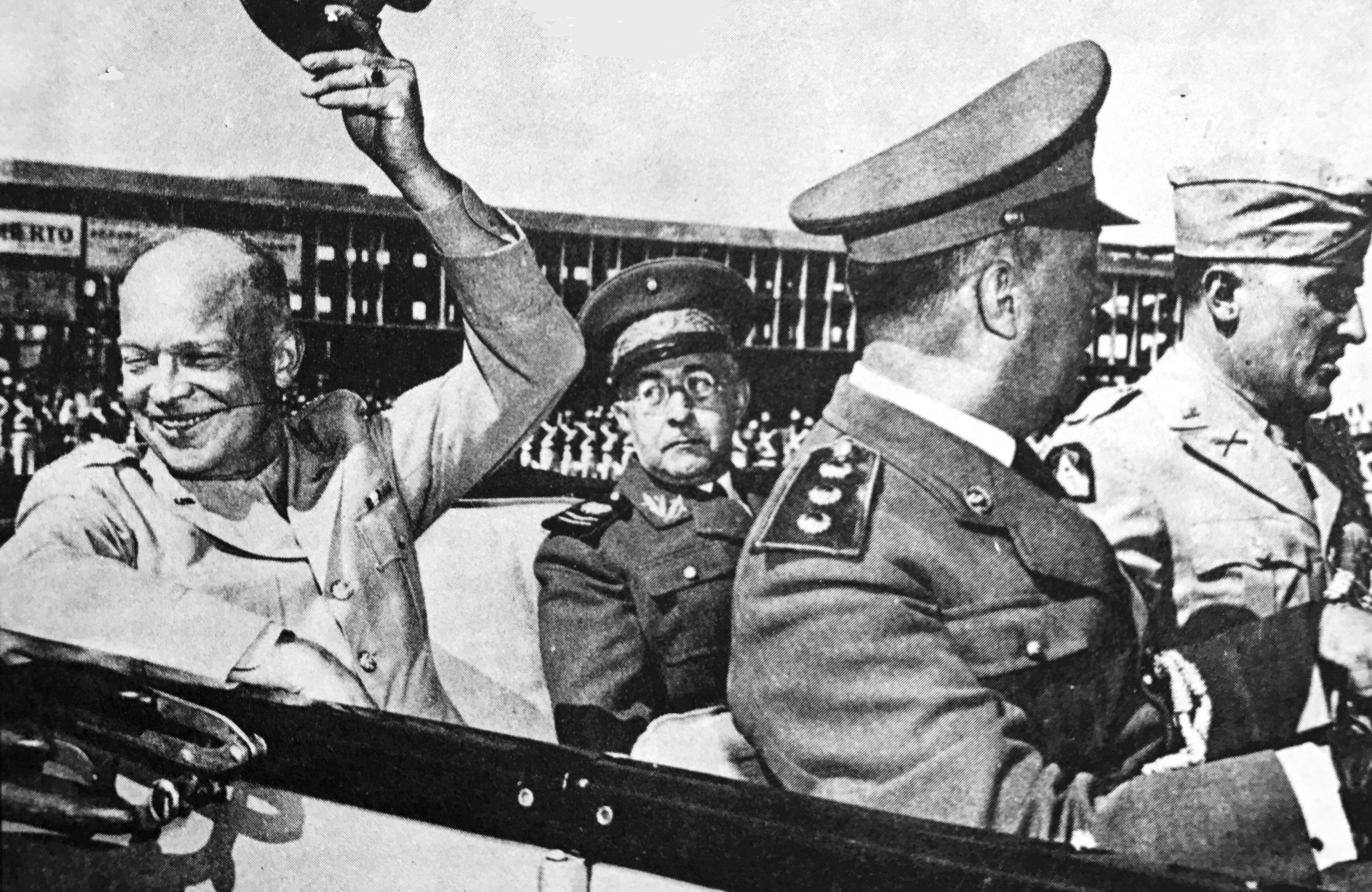
Brazil 1960

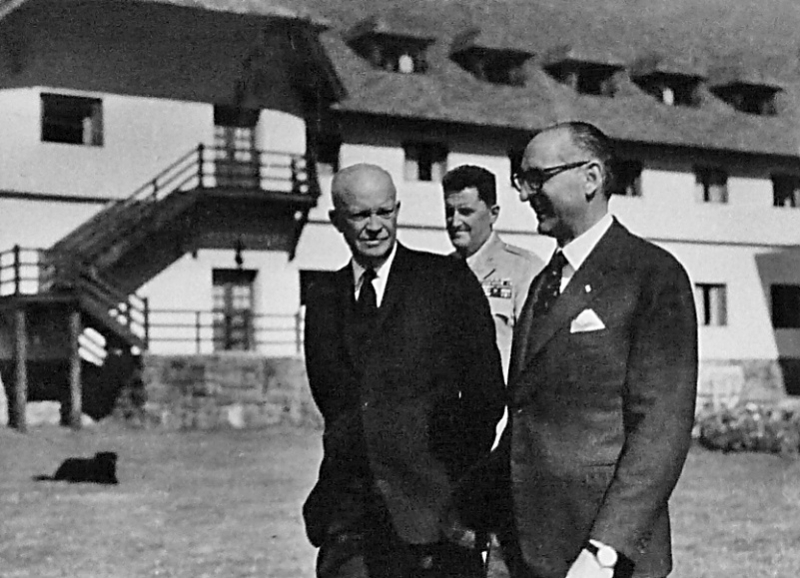
Argentina 1960

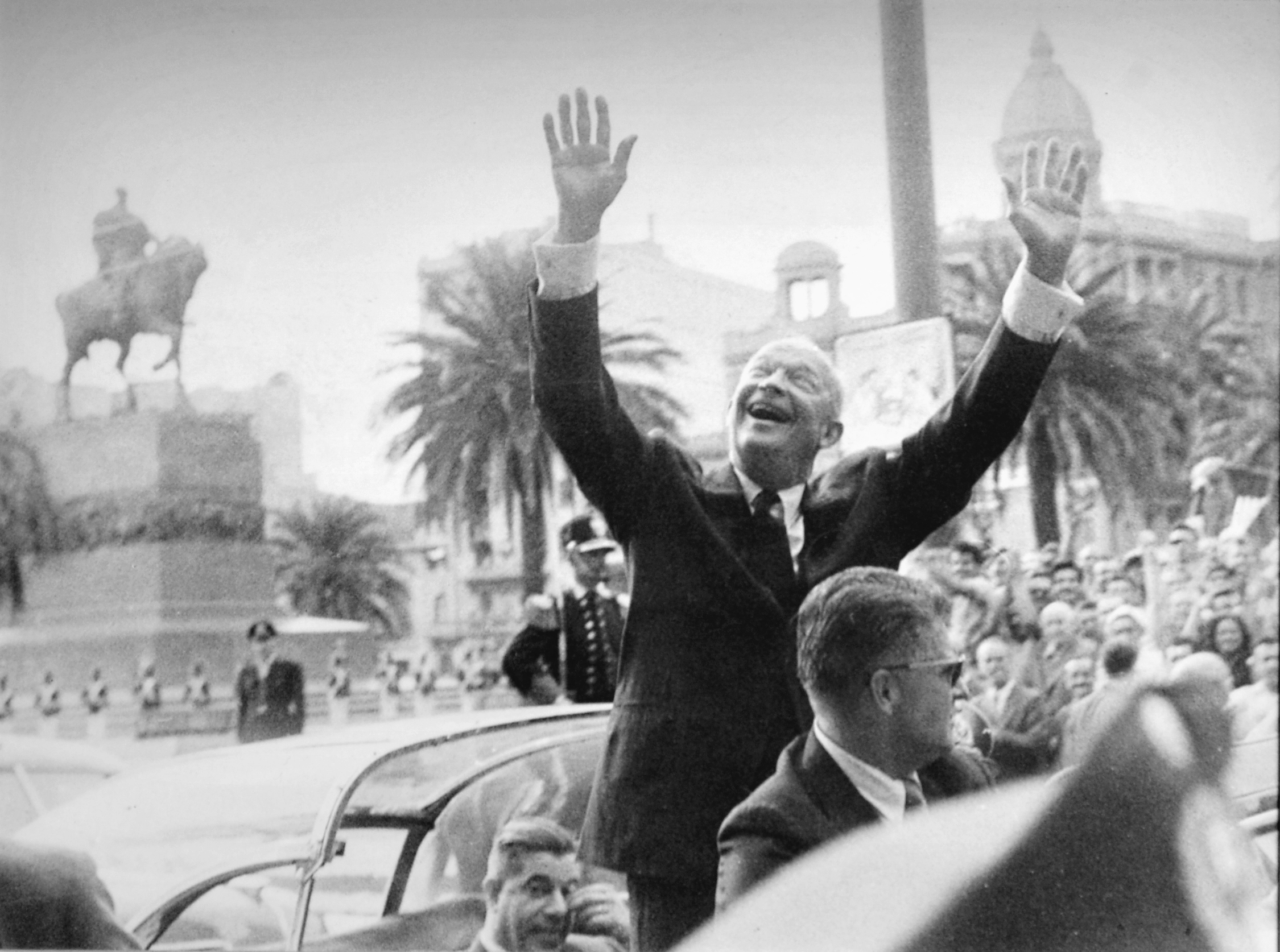
Uruguay 1960

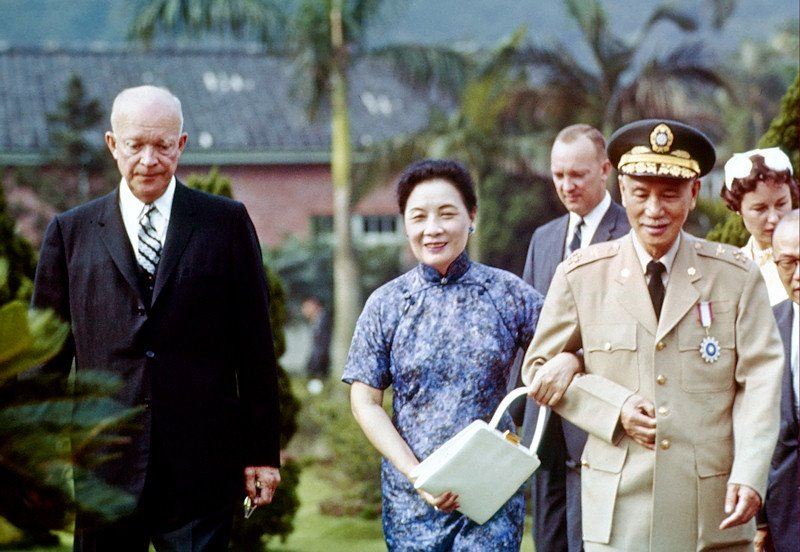
Taiwan 1960
