= Abu Ghadiya =

Member of al-Qaeda (1976-?)

Badran Turki Hishan al-Mazidi (Arabic: بدران تركي هيشان المزيدي)
- Born: 1977-1979; Mosul, Iraq or Damascus, Syria
- Died: November, 2004 (aged 25–26) or October 26, 2008 (aged 29–30); Abu Kamal, Syria
- Military career
- Allegiance: Al-Qaeda
- Nicknames: Abu Ghadiya (Arabic: أبو غادية); Abu al-Ghadia
- Units: Al-Qaeda in Iraq; Islamic State of Iraq
- Conflicts: Iraqi insurgency

Abu Ghadiya (Arabic: أبو غادية) was an al-Qaeda in Iraq (AQI) militant and smuggler. The United States Treasury Department claimed his real name was Badran Turki Hishan al-Mazidi (Arabic: بدران تركي هيشان المزيدي) and that he was born sometime between 1977 and 1979 in Mosul. However, other reports claimed that Abu Ghadiya was born in Damascus in 1976 and his real name was Sulayman Khalid Darwish (Arabic: سليمان خالد درويش). He graduated from the Damascus University Dentistry School sometime during the 1990s, until he later went to Afghanistan and joined al-Qaeda. He was primarily involved in the logistics of AQI's effort in Iraq and assisted in smuggling weapons, money and fighters across the Iraq–Syria border. The US claimed he was targeted and killed, in a cross-border raid conducted by the U.S. military and possibly the Syrian government as well on October 26, 2008. However, an al-Qaeda in Iraq obituary released in August 2006 says that Abu Ghadiya was killed by the Saudi-Iraqi border sometime in November 2004. The Syrian government protested the raid claiming, that it killed eight civilians. Journalists who reached the attack site reported claims by local people who said that the victims of the raid were all innocent civilians.

== Role in Iraqi insurgency ==
According to the United States Treasury Department, Abu Musab al-Zarqawi appointed Abu Ghadiya the lead Syrian commander for AQI's logistics in 2004. After Zarqawi's death, Abu Ghadiya took orders from his successor, Abu Ayyub Al-Masri, either directly or through a deputy. Abu Ghadiya allegedly provided false passports, safe houses, weapons and money to militants on the Syrian side of the Iraqi border before the fighters would cross into Iraq.

== Death ==
According to the United States, Abu Ghadiya was killed in a 2008 raid by US special operations forces inside Syrian territory. However, the U.S. never produced Abu Ghadiya's body. Contradicting American claims, an AQI obituary of the militant which was released in August 2006 stated that Abu Ghadiya had died on the Saudi–Iraqi border sometime after the US–Iraqi offensive on Fallujah in November 2004.
