= 1985 Beirut car bombings =

Failed assassination attempt in Beirut, Lebanon

- Part of Lebanese Civil War
- Location: 33.8524°N 35.5105°E; Bir al-Abed, Beirut
- Date: 8 March 1985
- Target: Mohammed Hussein Fadlallah
- Attack type: Car bombing, attempted assassination
- Deaths: 60–80
- Injuries: 200
- Perpetrator: CIA linked Lebanese counter-terrorism unit

On 8 March 1985, a car bomb exploded between 9 and 45 metres from the house of Shia cleric Sayyed Mohammad Hussein Fadlallah in Beirut, Lebanon, in a failed assassination attempt by a Lebanese counter-terrorism unit linked to the Central Intelligence Agency. The bombing killed up to 80 people and injured up to 200.

Beirut experienced three other deadly car bombs in the following months, this time targeting Christian areas. In a 22 May bombing, 48 people were killed and 120 were injured, while bombings on 14 and 18 August killed 14 and 50 respectively.

== The blast ==
The bomb explosion, estimated to have been equivalent to 200 kg (440 lbs) of dynamite, occurred in the western Beirut suburb of Bir al-Abed, outside an apartment building. It killed worshippers, mostly women and girls, leaving Friday prayer services at an adjacent mosque, and destroyed two 7-story apartment buildings and a cinema.

While several of Fadlallah's bodyguards were killed in the attack, the cleric escaped injury as he was attending Friday prayers at a nearby mosque.

Locals fired guns in the air, following the blast, trying to clear the roads to allow ambulances to pass. A banner was strung across the blast site by locals, reading "Made in USA."

== Historical context ==
In 1976, Gerald Ford became the first U.S. president to forbid political assassination, in the wake of the Church Commission, issuing Executive Order 11905. In 1981, President Ronald Reagan strengthened the policy with Executive Order 12333, which decreed that "No person employed by or acting on behalf of the United States Government shall engage in, or conspire to engage in, assassination." This Executive Order remains in effect today.

The Beirut car bombing occurred "within the continuously evolving framework of an American 'preemption' counterterror program". Following the 1983 United States embassy bombing, 1983 Beirut barracks bombings, and the 1984 U.S. embassy annex bombing, the U.S. military considered a range of retaliatory options, but it was unclear that these would have any deterrent value. On 14 November 1983, Then-president Ronald Reagan authorized a retaliatory strike, but Secretary of Defense Caspar Weinberger did not authorize U.S. aircraft to take off for reasons that have not been disclosed. CIA director William Casey, along with CIA General Counsel Stanley Sporkin, favored the use of preemptive counter-terrorism practices in Lebanon; others, including Deputy Director of Central Intelligence John N. McMahon, did not approve of the strategy, concerned that it would violate Executive Order 12333.

== Responsibility ==
In June 1985, The Washington Post reported that a CIA supported counter terrorism unit, made up of Lebanese Intelligence officers and others, was responsible for the bombing. They reported that the CIA did not authorize the bombing and had no direct links to the bombers. A Lebanese intelligence source said the CIA knew of plans for the bombing but did not want involvement because of the dangers to civilians. The CIA denied any complicity in the bombing. A House intelligence committee, in June 1985, said there was no evidence the CIA "encouraged or participated in any terrorist activity in Lebanon" or had knowledge of the bombing beforehand.

In the aftermath of the bombing, US officials cancelled its Beirut based counterterrorism operation, that trained Lebenese counterterrorism units, because of indirect links between the CIA and the bombing.

In 1987, reporter Bob Woodward wrote that CIA director William Casey, on his deathbed, had admitted personal culpability in the attack, which he suggests was carried out with funding from Saudi Arabia. Fadlallah would later suggest the amount $3,000,000 as the price that had been offered by the Saudis for Casey to arrange the bombing. Woodward suggests that Fadlallah accepted $2 million from the Saudis to stop attacks from Hezbollah. Asked about the allegations, President Reagan responded, "Never would I sign anything that would authorize an assassination... I never have, and I never will, and I didn't." William Casey's widow strongly denied that Woodward had spoken to Casey in hospital before his death.

The U.S. National Security Advisor, Robert McFarlane, stated that those responsible for the bomb may have had American training, but asserted that they were "rogue operative[s]," and the CIA in no way sanctioned or supported the attack. Woodward's own account of his conversation with Casey suggests that Casey's action was "off the books".

Several Lebanese politicians, such as Selim Hoss, blamed Israel for the attack, saying: "there is no doubt that Israel is behind this ugly crime". Hezbollah claimed that it had found a network of cooperation between the CIA, the Mossad, the Lebanese Army and the Kataeb Party.

== Aftermath ==
A car bomb on 22 May killed 48 people. Another on 14 August killed 15 people, and a bomb on 18 August exploded in a Christian suburb of East Beirut causing the death of 50 people. It was one of the worst explosions to take place in the city's east, which was relatively calm compared to the west.

A former CIA operative maintains that the failed 1985 attempt tarnished the CIA's reputation.

== In popular culture ==
The car bombing is described in Ken Follet's 2014 historical novel "Edge of Eternity". The bombing is mentioned by Raymond Reddington in the episode "Mr. Gregory Devry" of the TV Show The Blacklist.

== See also ==
- CIA activities in Lebanon
- Hezbollah
- Internal Security Forces
- Lebanese Army
- Lebanese Civil War
- Lebanese Forces – Executive Command
- South Lebanon Army
- Mountain War (Lebanon)
- Young Men (Lebanon)
