= 2008 Abu Kamal raid =

US attack on militant groups in Syria

- Part of the Iraq War
- The Al-Qa'im/Abu Kamal area on the Iraqi-Syrian border.
- Type: Special operations
- Location: Abu Kamal, Syria
- Planned by: United States
- Target: Non-state actor logistics network (according to the US)
- Date: 26 October 2008; 18 years ago
- Executed by: Delta Force; CIA's Special Activities Division
- Outcome: Disputed
- Casualties: 8 killed 7 wounded

The 2008 Abu Kamal raid was an attack carried out by helicopter-borne CIA paramilitary officers from Special Activities Division and United States Special Operations Command, Joint Special Operations Command inside Syrian territory on October 26, 2008.

The Syrian government called the event a "criminal and terrorist" attack on its sovereignty, alleging all of the reported eight fatalities were civilians. The US cited self-defense under Article 51 of the UN Charter, citing their belief that Syria was responsible for providing "sanctuary to terrorists", as justification for the attack.

== Background ==
Throughout the Iraq War, Syria had reportedly served as a conduit for foreign fighters intending to enter Iraq to fight the US, coalition, or Iraqi military and police forces. The Los Angeles Times reported that some US officials had complained that militants and their reinforcement and logistics networks have been able to operate openly in Syria and that the Syrian government had not made sufficient effort to stop it. The New York Times however reported that the timing of the raid was startling partly because American officials have praised the Syrian government in recent months for its efforts to halt traffic across the border. The US alleged that the militants flew into Damascus and then, with the help of emplaced networks, travelled across the Syrian border into Iraq, mainly through the city of Ramadi. Syrian President Bashar al-Assad denied these claims, while he admitted some militants do come into Syria through Damascus International Airport without knowledge from Syrian authorities, he claimed that the majority of militants crossed into Syria from the borders of neighboring countries.

In the summer of 2007, a US military raid on a suspected al-Qaeda in Iraq house in the Iraqi town of Sinjar, near Syria, yielded documents containing information about alleged Syrian smuggling networks used to move foreign fighters into Iraq. The documents included al-Qaeda in Iraq records of more than 500 foreign fighters who had entered from Syria, according to the Combating Terrorism Center at the US Military Academy, where civilian analysts examined the documents. A July 2008 report on what the documents contained indicated that at least 95 Syrian "coordinators" were involved in facilitating the movement of the foreign fighters into Iraq. The report stated that many of the coordinators were from smuggling families in Bedouin clans and other Syrian tribes. The documents, however, do not show any signs of any Syrian government involvement in the facilitation of these fighters.

Since the US-led invasion of Iraq in 2003, there had been a few reported incidents of the US military firing across the border at targets in Syria. Petraeus again stated in October 2008 that efforts by US and Iraqi forces, as well as by the Syrian government, had cut the number of militants crossing into Iraq from Syria from about 100 a month in early to mid-2007 to 20 a month. Petraeus, however, stated that more needed to be done to halt the flow of militants. In 2008, the US blamed violence in Mosul on foreign fighters from Syria.

=== Syrian permission given pre-attack ===
On October 28, Israeli journalist Ronen Bergman reported that Syrian intelligence had cooperated with the US against al-Qaeda, and that Syria had told the US that it would not intervene in a US strike. Several days later, The Times also reported that the Syrians had agreed to the raid through a backchannel established with the Syrian Air Force Intelligence Directorate. According to the report, after the Syrians gave the U.S. information pertaining to the location of Abu Ghadiya, they agreed to allow the U.S. to apprehend him and take him to Iraq; as such, when Syrian air defenses, on high alert since the Israeli-led Operation Orchard, detected the American helicopters and requested permission to engage them, it was denied. One tribal leader told the paper that an hour and a half after the attack, Syrian intelligence officers came to the area, warning the villagers that if they spoke about what had just occurred, their family members would die. He also claimed that a rocket-propelled grenade had been launched from the compound by one of the militants at the American helicopter. However, Akram Hamid, a survivor of the raid, said that "No one was shooting at the soldiers."

== The raid ==
The raid took place in Eastern Syria near Abu Kamal, which is near the Iraqi border city of Al-Qa'im. This area was regarded by the U.S. as the main crossing point into Iraq for fighters, money, and equipment in support of the Iraqi insurgency. At some point in time the Central Intelligence Agency confirmed the location of al-Qaeda coordinator Abu Ghadiya, accused of being responsible for much of the smuggling, and suggested the raid be undertaken. According to CNN, US President George W. Bush likely approved the mission.

Four American Black Hawk helicopters (other sources say 2 Black Hawk helicopters, who were escorted by 2 AH-6 little bird helicopters) entered Syrian airspace around 16:45 local time on October 26 and deployed roughly two dozen soldiers, who attacked a building under construction in the village of As Sukkariyah, just north of Abu Kamal. Sky News reported that two of the four American helicopters landed, allowing 10 US Army Special Forces (other sources say they were Delta Force) soldiers to disembark and storm a building under construction. The Syrian government stated that the soldiers killed eight civilians, including a man, his four children, and a married couple. Journalists reported that the local people say that the victims of the raid were all innocent civilians. However, U.S. officials continued to claim that all those killed during the raid were associated with Abu Ghadiya, the operation's target. A villager from the area stated that at least two men were seized by the American forces. An eyewitness told the BBC that two of the dead — the married couple — were "very simple people" who "lived in a tent and were being paid to guard building materials such as cement and timber, 24 hours a day. These people will have had nothing to do with the insurgency in Iraq." Syria's official news agency gave the names of the dead as Dahud Mohammed al-Abdullah, his four sons, and Ahmed Khalifeh Ali Abbas al-Hassan and his wife. The US disputed the Syrians' statement of civilian casualties, claiming that all of the people killed in the assault were militants.

== Target ==
The target of the raid was said to be a "foreign fighter logistics network". A U.S. source told CBS News that "the leader of the foreign fighters, an al-Qaeda officer, was the target of Sunday's cross-border raid." He said the attack was successful but did not say whether or not the al-Qaeda officer was killed. Fox News later reported that Abu Ghadiya, "Al Qaeda's senior coordinator operating in Syria", was killed in the attack and The New York Times reported that during the raid the US troops involved killed several armed males who "posed a threat."

Very little is known about Abu Ghadiya, the United States Department of the Treasury claimed that he was a Sunni Iraqi born between 1977 and 1979 in Mosul, whose actual name was Badran Turki Hishan al Mazidih. However, other reports claimed that Abu Ghadiya was born in Damascus in 1976 and his real name was Sulayman Khalid Darwish. He graduated from the Damascus University Dentistry School sometime during the 1990s, until he later went to Afghanistan and joined al-Qaeda. Both reports accuse him of working for Iraqi al-Qaeda leader Abu Mus'ab al-Zarqawi and the US claimed he later started working for Abu Ayyub Al-Masri after Zarqawi's death. The US had reportedly known about Abu Ghadiya for "months or years" and had been pressing the Syrian government to hand over, capture, or kill him. According to The New York Times, Abu Ghadiya was either killed near his tent or died after being taken by the American troops; his body was flown out of Syria. American officials have stated that Ghadiya was killed in the raid along with several other members of his cell.

The Syrian government disputed American claims, stating that these were "lies from the United States" and that the American troops had violated international law and Syrian sovereignty. A 2009 investigation by Vanity Fair that interviewed Syrian eyewitnesses, including a man shot during the raid, cast doubt on the Ghadiya assertion. Former Clinton administration official Robert Malley, who met with State Department officials at the time, was quoted in the article affirming that Ghadiya was killed in the raid. However, an al-Qaeda in Iraq obituary released in August 2006 says that Abu Ghadiya was killed by the Saudi-Iraqi border sometime in November 2004. Furthermore, former CIA officer Robert Baer was highly skeptical, saying, "If they brought back an al-Qaeda body, why don't they have something? There's no conceivable way they would have killed him and not shown it".

== Reactions ==
=== US government position ===
The Syrian Government called the raid "terrorist aggression" and a violation of their sovereignty. The Americans defended the action as self-defense under Article 51 of the UN Charter, citing their belief that Syria was responsible for providing "sanctuary to terrorists". The same reason was used for U.S. raids into Pakistan a few months before as part of the war on terror. Turkey had also used this argument for its raids against PKK rebels in northern Iraq, while Colombia used this defence for cross-border attacks against FARC.

The US position, as presented to the UN General Assembly a month before the incident by President George W. Bush, was that sovereign states have "an obligation to govern responsibly, and solve problems before they spill across borders. We have an obligation to prevent our territory from being used as a sanctuary for terrorism and proliferation and human trafficking and organized crime." Anthony Cordesman, an analyst at the US Center for Strategic and International Studies, said about the raid that, "When you are dealing with states that do not maintain their sovereignty and become a de facto sanctuary, the only way you have to deal with them is this kind of operation."

=== Syria and Iraq ===
[in response to U.S. claims that the raid was conducted to strike at an Al Qaeda operative] "This is lies from the United States ... Killing civilians in international law means terrorist aggression. We consider this criminal and terrorist aggression."

— Syrian foreign minister Walid Muallem

Syria summoned the U.S. and Iraqi chargés d'affaires to Damascus to protest the unauthorized raid. Sergeant Brooke Murphy, an American military spokesman in Baghdad, said that commanders were investigating. According to the Associated Press, an anonymous U.S. official said that a raid had taken place, and had aimed to target members of a foreign fighter logistics network that reached from Syria into Iraq. In other media, Syria characterized the attack as "terrorist aggression". Syrian Foreign Minister Walid Muallem went ahead with a meeting with UK Foreign Minister David Miliband the day after the raid, but their joint news conference was canceled. On October 28 Syria closed an American school called the Damascus Community School in Damascus and a US cultural center.

Iraq was in an awkward position because it wanted to remain friendly with Syria, but also wanted to prevent people believed to be creating unrest in Iraq from entering through Syria. Iraq's official spokesperson officially denounced the attack, stating, "The Iraqi government rejects U.S. aircraft bombarding posts inside Syria." However, an Iraqi Government spokesman stated Syria had in the past refused to hand over fighters who were accused of killing 13 Iraqi border guards. He also stated that the proposed agreement for US forces to stay in Iraq after the UN mandate ended "will limit this type of operation. It will limit the United States from using Iraqi land to attack others." Iraqi government spokesman Ali al-Dabbagh said about the raid, "This area was a staging ground for activities by terrorist organizations hostile to Iraq." al-Dabbagh added that Iraq had previously requested that Syria turn over members of the insurgent group that used Syria as its base.

Iraqi government officials in Mosul and the surrounding governorate of Ninevah strongly supported the raid and encouraged the US and Iraqi central governments to do even more to stop the flow of insurgents from Syria into Iraq. Said Khosro Goran, the vice-governor of Ninevah, "We have an open border with Syria and our neighbors are actively encouraging the terrorists."

=== International reactions ===
Russia condemned the attack and refused "the use of force against independent sovereign states under the disguise of combating terrorism." A Chinese foreign ministry spokesperson stated, "We oppose any deed that harms other countries' sovereignty and territorial integrity." India expressed disapproval of the raid, stating that actions resulting in the deaths of civilians are counterproductive. France expressed serious concern over the loss of Syrian civilian lives and called for restraint and respect for the territorial integrity of states. North Korea condemned the raid, stating "The military attack is an unpardonable, inhuman criminal act ... and state terrorism committed under the pretext of the anti-terrorism war" The government of Venezuela also condemned the raid, calling it a barbaric act, and President Hugo Chávez characterized the raid as illegal aggression. Vietnam opposed the US unilateral military attack and said that the sovereignty and territorial integrity of nations must always be absolutely respected. Cuba expressed vigorous condemnation for the raid, characterizing it as a criminal action and a violation of international law. The Indian Foreign Ministry said that "The scourge of terrorism affects many nations across the world. While this must elicit decisive responses, when such actions result in the death of innocent civilians, they defeat the very objective of the intervention."

The Arab League denounced the raid and voiced its support to Syria to protect its sovereignty and people. AL Secretary General Amr Moussa underlined the League's support for Syria's right to defend its land and people and called for an investigation in the incident to hold those responsible into account. The Foreign Ministry of Qatar said that the raid contravened "the principles of international law and charters", and expressed its condolences for those killed and injured. Iran condemned the raid, stating that "We actually condemn any attack which violates national sovereignty of countries and leads to the killing of innocent people. Such invasions are unacceptable." Facing increased internal pressure the Iraqi government unexpectedly criticized the expedition into the border village. A spokesman for the Iraqi, Ali al-Dabbagh, said: "The Iraqi government rejects US aircraft bombarding posts inside Syria. The constitution does not allow Iraq to be used as a staging ground to attack neighbouring countries."

==== Increased animosity ====
The Syrian government reacted by warning of retaliation if the US stages any more cross-border strikes, while also demanding respect of its sovereignty. The Syrian foreign minister accused the US of conducting a planned act of "criminal and terrorist aggression" in broad daylight with "blunt determination". Walid Muallem said, "We would defend our territories. All of them [were] civilian, unarmed, and they [were] on Syrian territory." The Syrians also summoned the US and Iraqi ambassadors to protest against the raid, according to the Syrian Sana news agency. Though the US did not officially respond to the accusations, sources were quoted saying a smuggling ring taking foreign fighters into Iraq was the target.

The Syrian government also ordered the closure of an American school and the American Cultural Center in Damascus. And a public spokesman for the US embassy in Damascus said on Wednesday that the Embassy may close to the public for an unspecified period of time.

On October 30, 2008, thousands of Syrians in Damascus protested against the raid. They waved national flags and banners reading "No to U.S. aggression on the Syrian territory" and "The American aggression will not succeed". The New York Times reported that the rally appeared to be organized and staged by the Syrian government. According to the Middle East Times, Syria publicly expressed anger to conceal its own involvement in the raid. Neither report could be verified independently.

=== Other reactions ===
A number of politicians in the United States have condemned the raid. Representative Dennis Kucinich protested the raid, stating, "Saber rattling and attacks upon sovereign nations who did not attack us are unacceptable." Representative Nick Rahall was quoted in 2009 as saying that "[Syrian civilians] lost their lives in an unfortunate attempt by the previous administration to once again mislead, bully, and isolate a regime".

== See also ==
- Operation Orchard (Israeli air-raid against alleged Syrian nuclear facility in 2007)
- Ain es Saheb airstrike
