= Eisenhower Doctrine =

American policy on the Middle East

The Eisenhower Doctrine was a policy enunciated by U.S. president Dwight D. Eisenhower on January 5, 1957, within a "Special Message to the Congress on the Situation in the Middle East". Under the Eisenhower Doctrine, a Middle Eastern country could request American economic assistance or aid from U.S. military forces if it was being threatened by armed aggression. Eisenhower singled out the Soviet threat in his doctrine by authorizing the commitment of U.S. forces "to secure and protect the territorial integrity and political independence of such nations, requesting such aid against overt armed aggression from any nation controlled by international communism." The phrase "international communism" made the doctrine much broader than simply responding to Soviet military action. A danger that could be linked to communists of any nation could conceivably invoke the doctrine.

Most Arabs regarded the doctrine as a transparent ploy to promote Western influence in the Middle East by restraining Gamal Abdel Nasser's brand of Arab nationalism that opposed Western domination, and some like the Syrians publicly denounced the initiative as an insidious example of U.S. imperialism. Following the 1958 crisis in Lebanon and accusations by U.S. senators of exaggerating the threat of communism to the region, Eisenhower privately admitted that the real goal was combating Arab nationalism.

== Background ==
In the global political context, the doctrine was made in response to the possibility of a generalized war, threatened due to the Soviet Union's latent threat becoming involved in Egypt after the Suez Crisis. Coupled with the power vacuum left by the decline of British and French power in the region after the U.S. protested against the conduct of their allies during the Suez War, Eisenhower thought that the strong position needed to better the situation was further complicated by the positions taken by Egyptian president Gamal Abdel Nasser, who was rapidly building a power base and using it to play the Soviets and Americans against each other, taking a position of "positive neutrality" and accepting aid from the Soviets.

On the regional level, the doctrine intended to provide the independent Arab regimes with an alternative to Nasser's political control, strengthening them while isolating communist influence through Nasser's isolation. It largely failed on that front, with Nasser's power quickly rising by 1959 to when he could shape the leadership outcomes in neighboring Arab countries such as Iraq and Saudi Arabia; in the meantime, his relationship with the Soviets deteriorated, allowing the U.S. to switch to a policy of accommodation.

The administration also saw the Middle East as being critical for future foreign policy regarding the U.S. and its allies. The region contains a large percentage of the world's oil reserves needed by the allies. Eisenhower's protests against longtime allies—Britain and France—during the Suez Crisis lead to the collapse of British influence and French influence in the Middle East, spawning fears of Soviet domination made more credible by Nasser's increasingly pro-Soviet disposition. The Eisenhower Doctrine was a backflip against the previous policy; the U.S. now had the burden of military action in the Middle East to itself.

The doctrine was enacted into public law in the United States by a Joint Resolution of Congress on March 9, 1957, but was not successfully applied in that year's crisis in Syria but was instead invoked in the Lebanon crisis the following year, when the U.S. intervened in response to a request by that country's then President Camille Chamoun.

== See also ==
- Foreign policy of the Dwight D. Eisenhower administration
- Syrian Crisis of 1957
- United States foreign policy in the Middle East
