= Damascus Community School =

Coordinates: 33°31′2″N 36°16′56″E

- (Syria) Abu Rummaneh; Syria

Information
- Type: Private
- Motto: "A Learning Community in Pursuit of Excellence"
- Established: 1957
- Chairman: Haynes Mahoney
- Vice Chairman: Nasha'at Sanadiki
- Director: James L. Liebzeit
- Gender: Co-educational
- Publication: What’s Happening
- Website: Official website

Damascus Community School is an unlicensed American school founded by the former US secretary of state John Foster Dulles in 1957 in Damascus, Syria. The school was built to promote American ideals and culture and to help steer Syria away from becoming a Soviet satellite. Since 2012, due to the situation in Syria, the school has been effectively shut down.

== Mission ==
The Damascus Community School laid its foundation with the help of Syria's former foreign minister Salah al-Bitar, who was one of the co-founders of the Baath party. After much controversy between the school and the Syrian government, Damascus Community School, was finally able to obtain full license from the government. However, throughout the decades the school has seen itself become part of a political tug-of-war between the Syrian and American government whenever the relations of the two countries become sour. Annual tuition reaches to about US$17,000.

After an American raid into Syrian territory on October 26, 2008, the Syrian government decided to shut down the Damascus Community School. The Americans defended the action as self-defense under Article 51 of the UN Charter, citing their belief that Syria was responsible for providing "sanctuary to terrorists". However, DCS Board of Directors voted to reopen Damascus Community School for 2010–2011 school year, grades pre- K through 8. Dr. James Leibzeit returned as a director. Following the 2011 unrest in Syria the school was shut down on January 22, 2012, and until further notice.
