= Grand Opera House (Manhattan) =

Theater in New York City (1868–1960)

Coordinates: 40°44′44″N 73°59′55″W

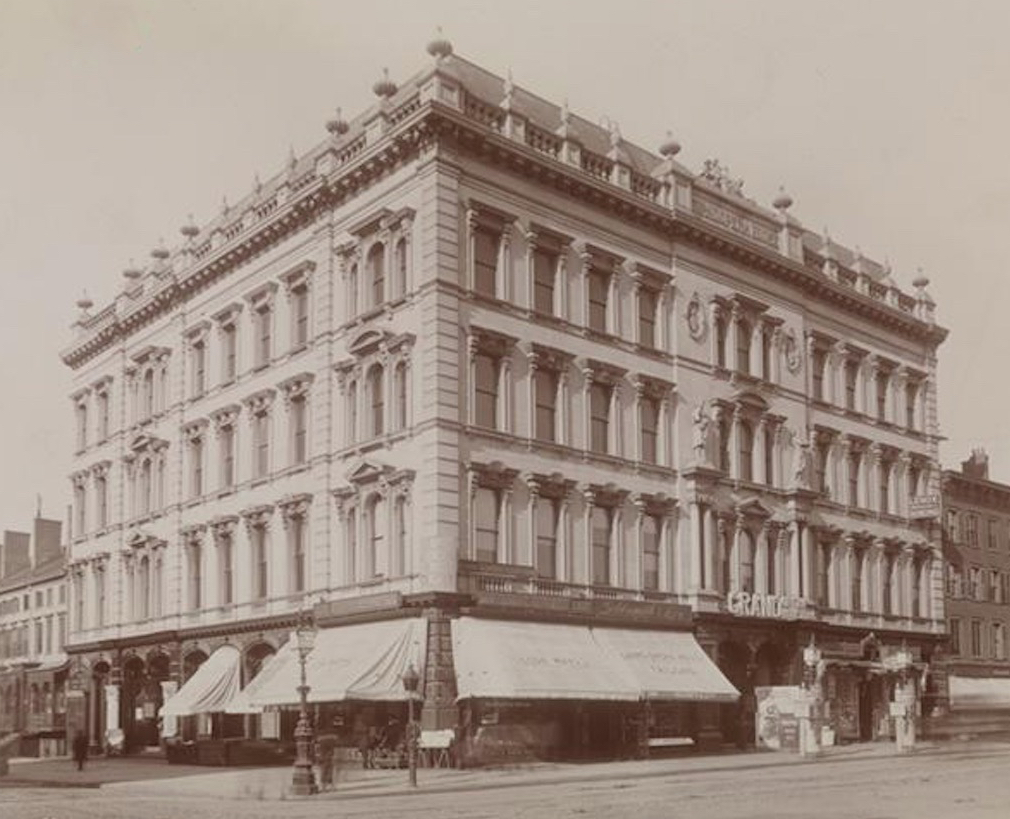
- Grand Opera House in 1895

General information
- Location: Manhattan, New York City
- Opened: 1868
- Demolished: 1960

Pike's Opera House, later renamed the Grand Opera House, was a theater in New York City on the northwest corner of 8th Avenue and 23rd Street, in the Chelsea neighborhood of Manhattan. It was constructed in 1868, at a cost of a million dollars (equivalent to about 24.2 million US dollars in 2025), for distiller and entrepreneur Samuel N. Pike (1822–1872) of Cincinnati. The building survived in altered form until 1960 as an RKO movie theater, after which it was replaced by part of Penn South, an urban renewal housing development, and the SVA Theatre. (Note: Pike was a German Jew, born in 1822 in Schwetzingen/Baden, Germany. His birth name was "Samuel N. Hecht"; his family changed the name in 1827 in the USA to "Pike". See: Rehs, Michael. Wurzeln in fremder Erde: Zur Geschichte der südwestdeutschen Auswanderung nach Amerika (Stuttgart: DRW-Verlag (de), 1984) ISBN 3-87181-231-5; OCLC 11160349.)

== History ==
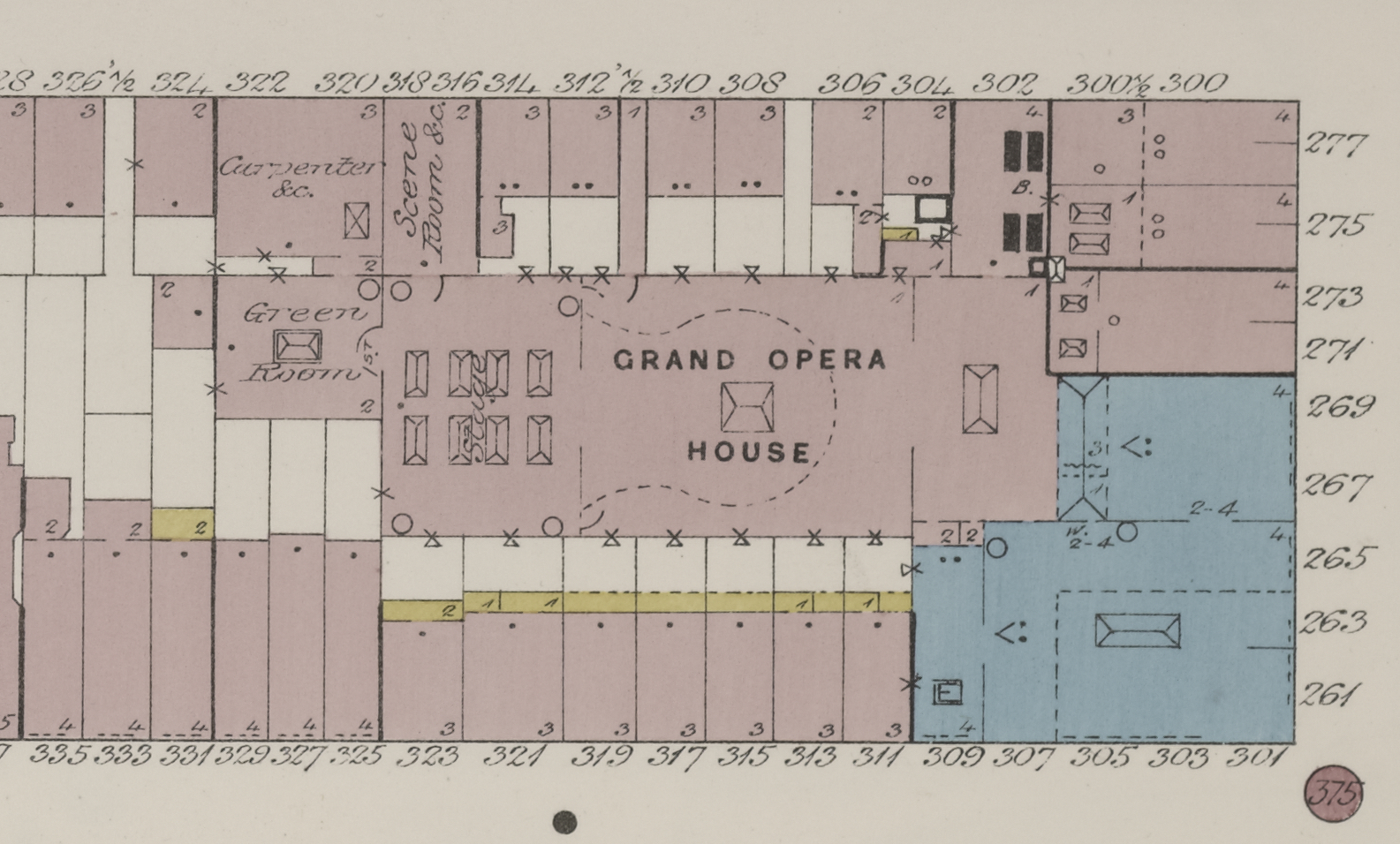
Detail from map published in 1899

Pike's Opera House was built on what had been the property of Clement Clarke Moore, whose home, "Chelsea", has given its name to the neighborhood. The architect was Griffith Thomas. The grand auditorium was seventy feet from parquet to dome, with six proscenium boxes and two tiers. It could accommodate 1800 people, but over 3500 were known to have gained admittance at some popular performances. The first performance, on January 9, 1868, was Il trovatore, after which seven operettas by Jacques Offenbach were given in the space of four months. But the theater lost money initially, owing in part to competition from the Academy of Music on 14th Street.

=== Fisk and the Grand Opera House ===
Jim Fisk and Jay Gould bought Pike's theater in January 1869 and renamed it the Grand Opera House. Fisk extended the repertory to include more operetta—Offenbach's La Périchole had already received its American premiere there, January 4, 1869—and plays, like Victorien Sardou's La Patrie, expressly translated for the theater. Vehicles for his mistress Josie Mansfield are often reported, though her name does not appear in the detailed cast lists in Brown. It was also reported, that her house west of the theater on 23rd Street was connected to the theater by a tunnel. (Note: Frances Farmer portrayed her in the wildly inaccurate film The Toast of New York (1937).)

=== Fisk's murder ===
At the time when Fisk and Gould's failed attempt to corner the market in gold resulted in "Black Friday", September 1869, Fisk barricaded himself in his second-floor premises at the opera house, which served as headquarters for his Erie Railway. When he was shot by his partner, Edward S. Stokes, Fisk's body lay in state in the grand lobby.

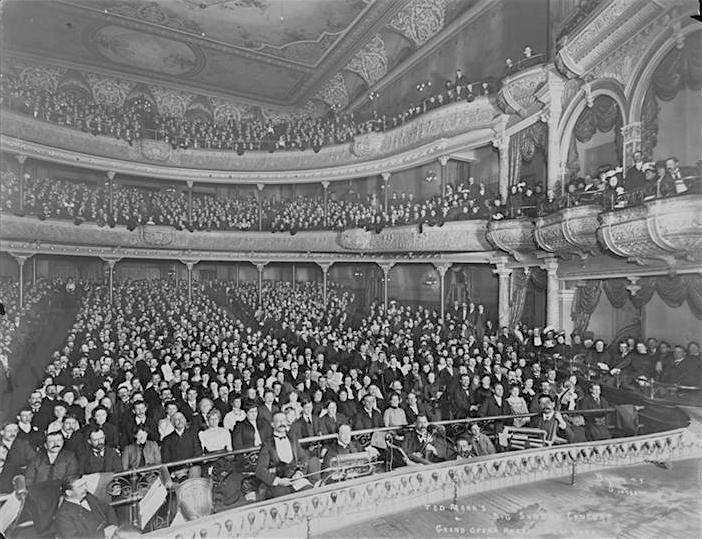
Ted Mark's Sunday night concert, c. 1900

=== Poole and Donnelly ===
In 1876, when the authorities began cracking down on theatre fire safety, the Grand Opera House was the only theatre to pass inspection.

A rapid series of managers were unable to make the house a financial success, its overhead swallowing profit. "The house was considered, in theatrical parlance, a 'Jonah', and it was almost impossible to find any respectable manager who would take it," according to theater critic Thomas Allston Brown. When John F. Poole (1833–1893) and Thomas Lester Donnelly (1832–1880) rented the theatre in the Autumn of 1876, with the proviso that "a small percentage of the profits should go to the Erie Railway company". The new management lowered the price of admission and catered to the popular tastes of New York's "west side": Uncle Tom's Cabin (in blackface) and Buffalo Bill were among the first season's attractions; theatrical productions were accompanied by "specialty acts". When Donnelly died in 1880, Poole, in partnership with Donnelly's widow, Sarah Donnelly (née Sarah D. Williams; 1840–1888), continued managing the theatre until May 31, 1882. (Note: Thomas Lester Donnelly and Sarah Donnelly were the parents of (i) actress and playwright Dorothy Donnelly (1876–1928) and (ii) New York State Senator and Judge Thomas F. Donnelly (1863–1924). Thomas Lester Donnelly, in the 1860s was acclaimed as "the Irish comedian". Sarah was a sister of Fred Williams (né Frederick James Williams; 1829–1900), who, among other things, had been stage director of Daly's Theatre, stage director of the Lyceum Theatre on Park Avenue, and Dean of the Faculty of the American Academy of Dramatic Arts.)

=== RKO movie theatre ===
For its conversion to the second RKO 23rd Street Theater, Thomas W. Lamb Associates converted it in modern style. It opened August 4, 1938 with a double bill of Having a Wonderful Time and Sky Giant. It closed for demolition on June 15, 1960, in order to make way for the Penn South housing development, and was gutted by fire June 29. RKO later constructed a new theater (later called Chelsea West Cinemas) in Penn South just west of the old opera house, now used by the School of Visual Arts as the SVA Theater.
