= Daniel Drew =

American businessman

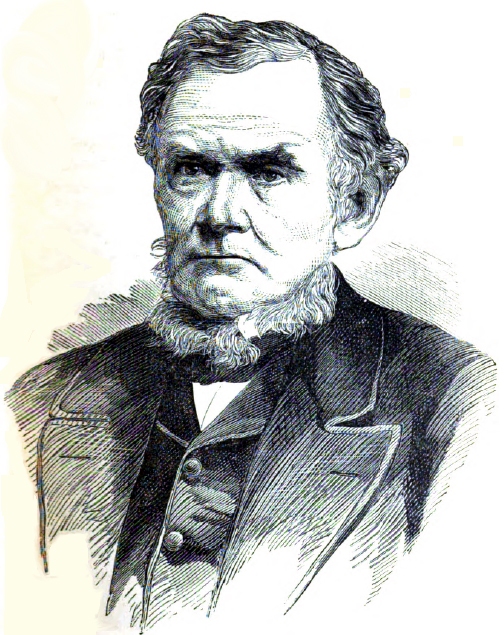
- Drew in 1872
- Born: July 29, 1797; Carmel, New York, U.S.
- Died: September 18, 1879 (aged 82); New York City, U.S.
- Occupation: Finance
- Years active: 1840–1875
- Known for: Stock market speculation and manipulation
- Spouse: Roxanna Mead
- Children: Catharine D Drew (1821-1883); Josiphine Drew (1836-1837); William Henry Drew (1843-1912)

Daniel Drew (July 29, 1797 – September 18, 1879) was an American businessman, steamship and railroad developer, and financier, one of the "robber barons" of the Gilded Age. Summarizing his life, Henry Clews wrote: "Of all the great operators of Wall Street ... Daniel Drew furnishes the most remarkable instance of immense and long-continued success, followed by utter failure and hopeless bankruptcy".

== Biography ==
Drew was born in Carmel, New York, to Gilbert Drew and Catherine Muckleworth. He was poorly educated and saw hardship after his father, who owned a small cattle farm, died when Daniel was 15 years old. Drew enlisted in the U.S. Army during the War of 1812 but he did not see combat. After the war, he spent some time with a traveling zoo and then built a successful cattle-droving business.

In 1820, he moved to New York City, where he ran the Bull's Head Tavern in the Bowery section of New York City, a location frequented by drovers and butchers doing business in the city. While running the tavern, he formed a partnership with two other drovers, buying cattle from neighboring counties and bringing them to New York for sale. In 1823, he married Roxanna Mead.

In 1834, he entered the steamboat business, purchasing a share of a boat operating on the Hudson River. Competing with Cornelius Vanderbilt against the Hudson River Steamboat Association, he ran numerous profitable lines outside of New York City.

Around this time, Drew began to speculate in stocks. He founded the brokerage firm of Drew, Robinson & Company in 1844, which dissolved a decade later with the death of his partner. Following this, he operated as an independent trader. In 1857, Drew became a member of the board of directors of the Erie Railroad and used his position to manipulate the railroad stock price. He joined forces with Vanderbilt to rescue the Erie from bankruptcy, and also became a director of the New York and Harlem Railroad, where he again collaborated with Vanderbilt to prop up that company's finances.

In 1864, Drew once again struggled with Vanderbilt, speculating on the stock of the New York and Harlem. Drew was selling the stock short, but Vanderbilt and his associates bought every share he sold, ultimately causing the stock price to rise from 90 to 285 in five months. Drew lost $500,000.

In 1866 to 1868, Drew engaged in the Erie War, in which Drew conspired along with fellow directors James Fisk and Jay Gould to issue stock to keep Vanderbilt from gaining control of the Erie Railroad. Vanderbilt, unaware of the increase in outstanding shares, kept buying Erie stock and sustained heavy losses, eventually conceding control of the railroad to the trio.

In 1870, Fisk and Gould betrayed Drew, manipulating the stock price of the Erie Railroad and causing him to lose $1.5 million Fisk was killed in January 1872 by a jealous rival over a mistress; Gould was later swindled out of $1,000,000 worth of Erie railroad stock and never controlled the Erie Railroad. The Panic of 1873 cost Drew still more, and by 1876, he filed for bankruptcy, with debts exceeding a million dollars and no viable assets. He died in 1879, dependent on his son, William for support.

== Legacy ==
Drew left behind a controversial legacy, but few written records. Many details about his life come from Bouck White's 1910 Book of Daniel Drew. White, a socialist activist, claimed to have "found" Drew's journal, publishing it as an autobiography. Drew biographer Clifford Browder has called the book "an enduring fake." Daniel Drew's son also contested the authenticity of the work when it was published.

In the introduction to White's 1915 Letters from Prison: Socialism a Spiritual Sunrise, the editor similarly notes that The book of Daniel Drew was "a work from his [White's] pen" and "a freely rendered biography of Daniel Drew". Despite having been established as a forgery, many details and inaccurate quotes from The Book of Daniel Drew are still mistakenly regarded as factual. The longevity of the work's influence is also in part due to fabulations in the 1937 film adaptation of the book. The film The Toast of New York starred Edward Arnold, Cary Grant, Frances Farmer, and Jack Oakie.

Details of Drew's life may be gleaned from other sources. At the zenith of his career as a financier, his personal fortune was estimated at $13 million and he was respectfully called "Uncle Daniel" on Wall Street. Drew's business tactics caused him to often be vilified, however, with White claiming that newspapers depicted Drew as "one of the curses of the market for years past. If he has now received such a blow as will result in his being driven from the Street altogether, no one will be sorry for him", and "he holds the honest people of the world to be a pack of fools".

A devout Methodist, Drew built churches in Port Jervis, New York, Carmel, and Brewster, New York. He also contributed to the founding of Drew Theological Seminary in Madison, New Jersey, which is now part of Drew University, and Drew Seminary for Young Ladies in his home town of Carmel (which burnt down and closed in 1904).

Drew Street, in eastern Baltimore, is reportedly named after him due to Drew's involvement as an investor in the Baltimore Canton Company, which owned and developed much of the area through the early 1900s.

Drew is popularly credited with introducing what would be called "watered stock" to the Wall Street, to describe company shares that were issued by false means including counterfeit stock certificates and unauthorized stock release, resulting in a dilution of ownership. The term came from his time in the livestock business, when he would have his cattle lick salt and drink water before selling them, to increase their weight. The watered stock tactic was used in the Erie War of the 1860s, when Drew along with James Fisk and Jay Gould blocked arch rival Cornelius Vanderbilt from getting ownership of the Erie Railroad. Drew biographer Clifford Browder warns that "not all the Uncle Daniel stories should be believed," and many stories about his business tactics—especially those recounted by White—should be read with skepticism.

Drew is credited, perhaps apocryphally, with an expression that describes the nature of short selling: "He who sells what isn't his'n, must buy it back or go to pris'n." (Note: This quote is not listed in any of the standard reference works of quotations, nor do any of them cite any quotations attributed to Drew at all, raising the probability that this attribution is apocryphal. The quote has also been attributed to author John Brooks, from his 1969 book of collected essays from The New Yorker, Business Adventures: Twelve Classic Tales from the World of Wall Street.)

== See also ==
- List of railroad executives
