= Ella Wesner =

Male impersonator (1841–1917)

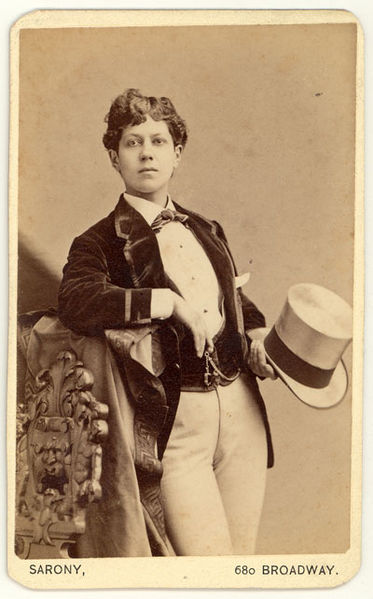
- Wesner in a carte de visite by Napoleon Sarony, c. 1872-75
- Born: May 29, 1841; New Jersey, U.S.
- Died: November 10, 1917 (aged 76); The Bronx, New York, U.S.
- Resting place: Evergreens Cemetery, Brooklyn, New York
- Occupation: Vaudeville performer

Ella Wesner (May 29, 1841 – November 10, 1917) was a celebrated male impersonator of the Gilded Age vaudeville circuit.

== Early life and education ==
Ella (or Ellen) Wesner was born in New Jersey and raised in Philadelphia, Pennsylvania, the child of Charles H. Wesner and Evalina (or Emeline) Wesner. She began her career at the age of nine as part of a family of vaudeville and musical-stage dancers. She was half of the Wesner Sisters with her sister Mary.

== Career ==
By her mid-twenties, Wesner was playing both male and female roles, at some point meeting and working as a "dresser" for a popular vaudeville male impersonator of the time, Annie Hindle. She developed her own impersonator act based on Hindle's, as a "swaggering, cigar-smoking, swearing" young man. Hindle and Wesner worked together on the vaudeville circuit, and sang some of the same songs, both using a husky, contralto voice for their performances.

Wesner's career was also closely linked to the vaudeville impresario Tony Pastor, for whom she was the featured male impersonator, performing at Pastor's theater and touring in traveling shows he organized.

Wesner's career was briefly derailed in 1872 when she abruptly left Pastor's shows to elope to Paris with the notorious Helen Josephine "Josie" Mansfield, who had been the mistress of Gilded Age robber baron "Diamond Jubilee" Jim Fisk as well as the mistress of his murderer, Edward S. Stokes. The event evoked considerable scandal; it was discussed in most of the major metropolitan newspapers and journals in New York, Chicago, and other major American cities. After the romance cooled, however, Wesner returned to the United States and resumed her career with Pastor, winning even wider audiences. She performed in London concert halls in 1877.

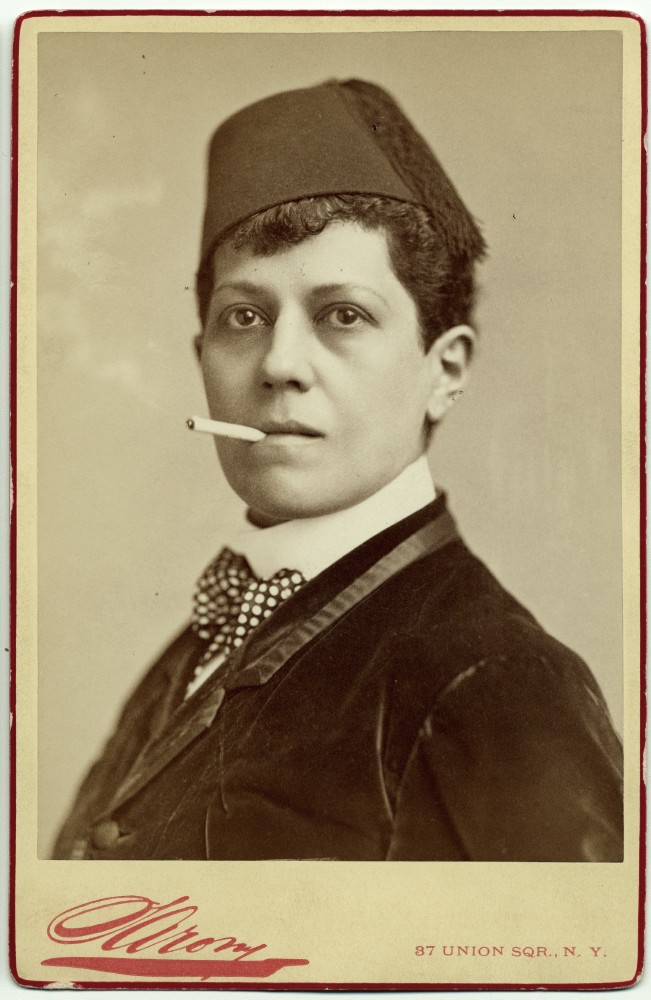
Ella Wesner publicity photograph, from about 1880

In the 1880s, Wesner's act included not only songs celebrating the "sporting" life and skits such as her popular rendition of a drunkard getting a barber's shave, but also monologues containing advice for men about how to court, treat and satisfy women. She also sang songs to promote certain brands of alcohol and tobacco; that she was drawing extra income from these advertisements outraged the orchestra involved. Wesner's career stumbled as styles changed; she shifted routines to become a "quick-change" artist, and eventually faded from vaudeville. Impersonator and singer Ella Shields credited Ella Wesner as an inspiration.

== Death ==
Wesner died in the Bronx in 1917, at the age of 76. By her request, her body was dressed in a menswear suit for burial. Her grave is in the Actors' Fund Plot, Prospect Hill at Evergreens Cemetery, in Brooklyn, New York.
