= Watered stock =

Asset with artificially high value

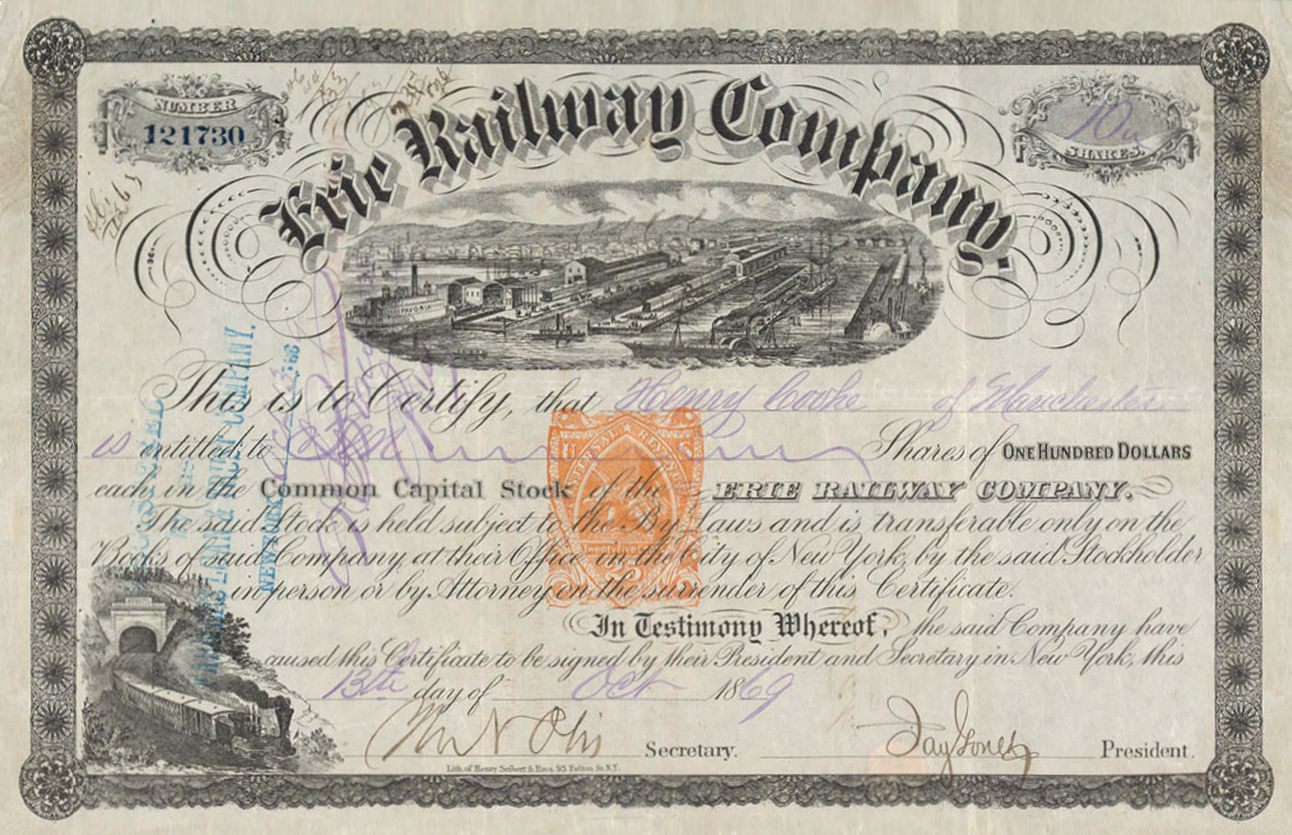
Jay Gould, as president of the Erie Railroad, notoriously issued watered stock to defeat a takeover attempt.

Watered stock is an asset with an artificially-inflated value. The term most commonly refers to a form of securities fraud in which a company issues stock to someone before receiving at least the par value in payment.

Historically, stock watering was prevalent in the 19th century rail industry in the United States.

== Origin of term ==
"Stock watering" was originally a method used to increase the weight of livestock before sale. The cattle were first given salt to make them thirsty, then allowed to drink their fill of water. The term's introduction to the New York financial district is popularly credited to Daniel Drew, a cattle driver turned financier.

== Explanation ==
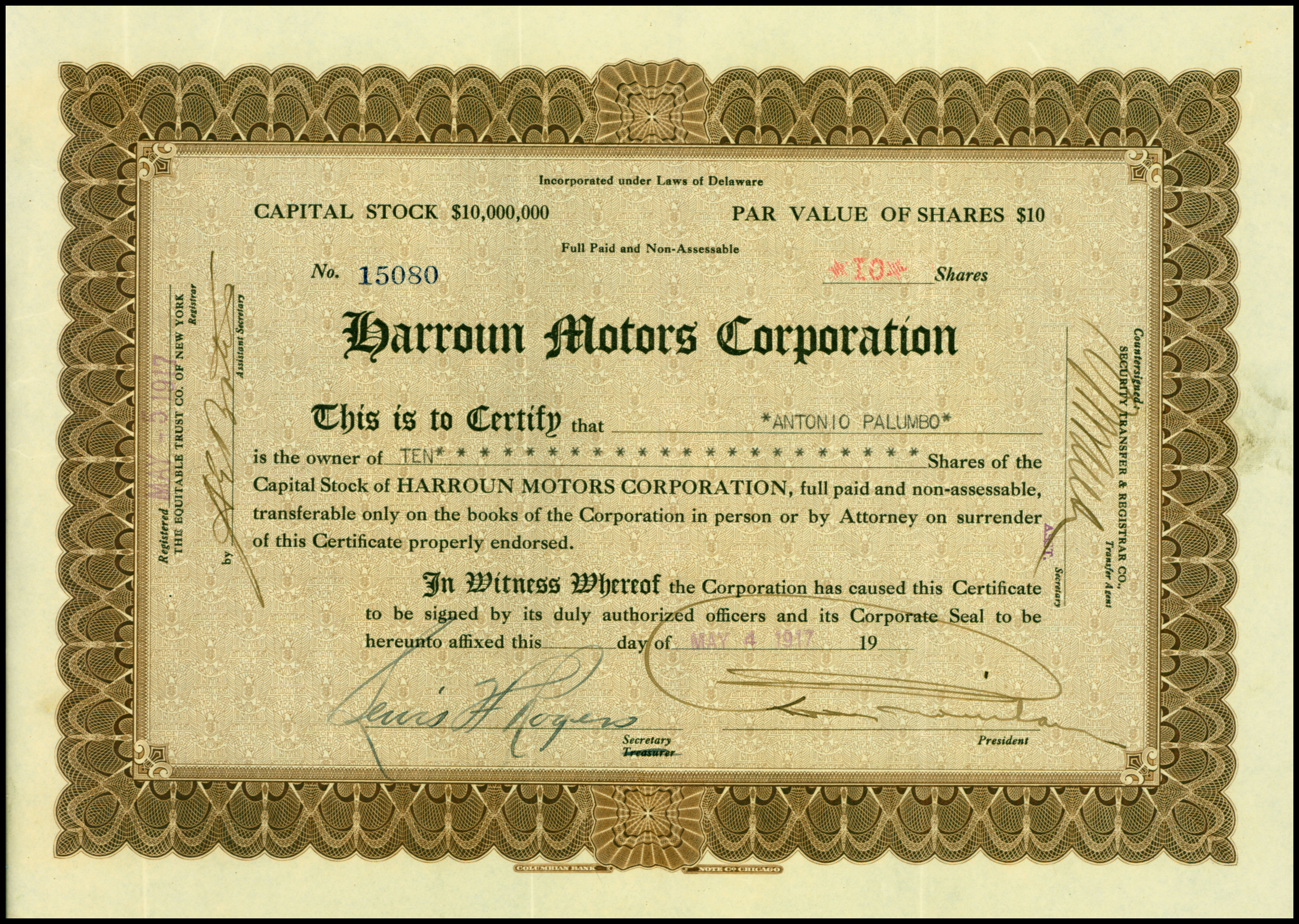
To indicate that the stock is not watered, this stock certificate declares the par value of $10 per share "full paid and non-assessable."

American stock promoters in the late 1800s could inflate their claims about a company's assets and profitability, and sell stocks and bonds in excess of the company's actual value. To do so, they would contribute property to a new corporation in return for stock at an inflated par value. On the balance sheet, the property would be the corporation's only capital, and because legal capital was fixed to aggregate par value, the value of the property would go up. While the promoter had $10,000 in stock, the corporation might have only $5,000 worth of assets but would still be worth $10,000 on paper.

Holders of watered stock could be personally liable if creditors foreclosed on the corporation's assets. If they had received $10,000 in stock for a $5,000 capital contribution, they would not only lose their $5,000 investment but also be personally liable for the additional $5,000, whether they were the aforementioned promoter lying about the value of their contribution or an innocent investor relying on par value to gauge the true value of the corporation.

Because par value was such an unreliable indicator of the actual value of stock and high par values could create liability for investors if the corporation went into bankruptcy, corporate lawyers began advising their clients to issue stocks with low par values. The legal capital or "stated capital" of the corporation would still be determined based on par value, but the balance sheet would include the investment over par value as a capital surplus, and everything would still balance.

In 1912, New York authorized corporations to issue "no par stock" with no par value at all in which case the board of directors would allocate the incoming capital between stated capital and capital surplus. All the other states followed suit. Thanks in large part to a proliferation of low par and no par stock, watered stock is less of an issue these days.

== Examples ==
- In 1866–1868, during the so-called Erie War, Cornelius Vanderbilt was defrauded by James Fisk, Daniel Drew and Jay Gould, who sold $7,000,000 worth of watered stock to him in his attempt to acquire the Erie Railroad.
- In 1873, the Railway Commissioners of Illinois reported that the stock of the railway companies in the state was inflated to $75,000,000, bringing $6,000,000 in yearly profits. In particular, the investigation uncovered that 75% of the Central Pacific Company's assumed capital was fictitious.
- In 1879, the Hepburn Committee found that stock watering was prevalent in the rail industry, as stock was frequently issued for speculative purposes.
- In 1898, the Adams Express Company declared a hundred-per-cent dividend, which has been described as a flagrant case of stock watering.
- The last significant watered stock claim in American law occurred in 1956. In that case, the Minute Maid company (then part-owned by its pitchman, Bing Crosby) attempted to recover debts directly from the owner of a distribution business on the basis that he had never fully paid the $45,000 par value of his stock.

== Criticism ==
The ethics of stock watering have been debated.

The practice of watered stock was sharply criticized by members of the Social Gospel movement such as George D. Herron and Walter Rauschenbusch. For example, in 1898, Herron said "watered stock is a method of high treason by which corporations forcibly tax the nation for private profit, and by which they annually extort millions from American toilers and producers. It is... essentially a system of violence, spoil, and robbery."

== See also ==
- David Dodd
- Daniel Drew
- Counterfeiting
