= The Toast of New York =

1937 film by Rowland V. Lee

- Theatrical release poster
- Directed by: Rowland V. Lee
- Screenplay by: Dudley Nichols; John Twist; Joel Sayre
- Based on: The Book of Daniel Drew by Bouck White and "Robber Barons" by Matthew Josephson
- Produced by: Edward Small
- Starring: Edward Arnold; Cary Grant; Frances Farmer; Jack Oakie
- Cinematography: Peverell Marley
- Edited by: George Hively; Samuel E. Beetley
- Music by: Nathaniel Shilkret
- Production company: RKO Radio Pictures
- Distributed by: RKO Radio Pictures
- Release date: July 22, 1937
- Running time: 109 minutes
- Country: United States
- Language: English
- Budget: $1.07 million
- Box office: $1.05 million

The Toast of New York is a 1937 American biographical film directed by Rowland V. Lee and starring Edward Arnold, Cary Grant, Frances Farmer, and Jack Oakie. The film is a fictionalized account of the lives of financiers James Fisk and Edward S. Stokes. The screenplay was based on the book The Book of Daniel Drew by Bouck White and the story "Robber Barons" by Matthew Josephson.

== Plot ==
In post-Civil War America, unscrupulous, ambitious partners Jim Fisk and Nick Boyd talk tight-fisted businessman Daniel Drew into selling them his shipping company, paying with worthless Confederate bonds. Later, worried that his longtime rival, Cornelius Vanderbilt, is trying to take control of his railroad, Drew seeks help from Fisk, only to have him turn the situation to his own advantage. Fisk and Boyd eventually become powers to be reckoned with on Wall Street.

Meanwhile, both men fall in love with entertainer Josie Mansfield. Mansfield agrees to marry Fisk out of gratitude, but really loves Boyd.

Fisk's greed grows beyond all reason and he tries to corner the market in gold. When Fisk ignores Boyd's warnings, Boyd turns against him, worried that the resulting panic threatens the financial system of the whole country. The federal government finally intervenes by releasing its gold reserves, bankrupting Fisk in the process.

== Cast ==
- Edward Arnold as Jim Fisk
- Cary Grant as Nick Boyd (based on Edward S. Stokes)
- Frances Farmer as Josie Mansfield
- Jack Oakie as Luke
- Donald Meek as Daniel Drew
- Thelma Leeds as Fleurique
- Clarence Kolb as Vanderbilt
- Billy Gilbert as Photographer
- George Irving as Broker
- Russell Hicks as Lawyer
- Dudley Clements as Collins
- Lionel Belmore as President of Board
- James Finlayson - uncredited
- Robert McClung as Bellhop
- Robert Dudley as Janitor
- Dewey Robinson as Beef Dooley
- Stanley Fields as Top Sergeant

== Production ==
The film was originally announced as The Robber Barons to star Robert Donat who had just made Count of Monte Cristo for producer Edward Small.

Filming was meant to take four weeks but ended up taking fifteen with Arnold on $10,000 a week, half of which went to B. P. Schulberg who owned his contract. Costing Small this much money gave satisfaction to Arnold, who had been rejected by the producer seeking his representation as an agent in 1918. Costs blew out on the production and there ended up being at least seven writers on the script.

== Reception ==
=== Critical ===
Reviews were mixed. Frank S. Nugent wrote that it was "only moderately entertaining" and "a familiar formula Arnold show." Variety called it "good entertainment despite its inanities, extravagances and exaggerations." Harrison's Reports wrote that it was "lacking in dramatic force" and had unsympathetic characters but offered "several thrilling moments." Russell Maloney of The New Yorker called the story "fumbling and aimless" and found "shocking anachronisms" in the dialogue, concluding, "Not recommended."

Modern Screen’s Leo Townsend wrote that the film was "well-knit screen entertainment" but questioned its historical accuracy. He commented that Edward Arnold’s performance was "a duplicate of his Diamond Jim Brady" (in 1935’s Diamond Jim) and that "Grant adds to his acting stature with each performance and Miss Farmer, the most un-Hollywoodish looking girl in town, makes her role outstanding."

=== Box office ===
The film was a commercial disappointment, losing $530,000, making it RKO's biggest money loser of the year. This led to Edward Small leaving RKO and returning to United Artists.
