= Joseph Mansfield =

Joseph Mansfield may refer to:

- Joseph K. Mansfield (1803–1862), Civil War Union general
- Joseph J. Mansfield (1861–1947), U.S. Representative from Texas
- Joseph Mansfield (journalist) (1828–1854), American newspaper reporter
