= Erie War =

19th-century Wall-Street battle for control of the Erie Railroad

The Erie War was a 19th-century conflict between American financiers for control of the Erie Railway Company, which owned and operated the Erie Railroad. Built with public funds raised by taxation and on land donated by public officials and private developers, by the middle of the 1850s the railroad was mismanaged and heavily in debt. A cattle drover turned Wall Street banker and broker, Daniel Drew, at first loaned $2 million to the railroad, and then acquired control over it. He amassed a fortune by skillfully manipulating the Erie railroad shares on the New York Stock Exchange. Cornelius Vanderbilt, who set his mind on building a railroad empire, saw multiple business and financial opportunities in railways and decided in 1866 to corner the market on Erie by silently scooping-up the Erie railroad stock. After succeeding, Vanderbilt permitted Drew to stay on the board of directors in his former capacity as treasurer.

== Watered-down stocks ==
Between 1866 and 1868, Daniel Drew conspired with James Fisk and Jay Gould, whom he brought on the board, to issue spurious Erie Railroad shares, thus "watering down" the stock, of which unsuspecting Cornelius Vanderbilt bought a large quantity. Vanderbilt lost more than $7 million in his attempt to gain control over Erie Railway Company, although Gould later returned most of the money under threat of litigation. As a result, Vanderbilt conceded control of the railroad to the trio. They were involved with the corrupt Tammany Hall political party machine, and made Boss Tweed a director of the Erie Railroad. Tweed (who later died in prison for embezzlement and fraud), in return, arranged favorable state legislation in Albany for them, legalizing the newly issued shares.

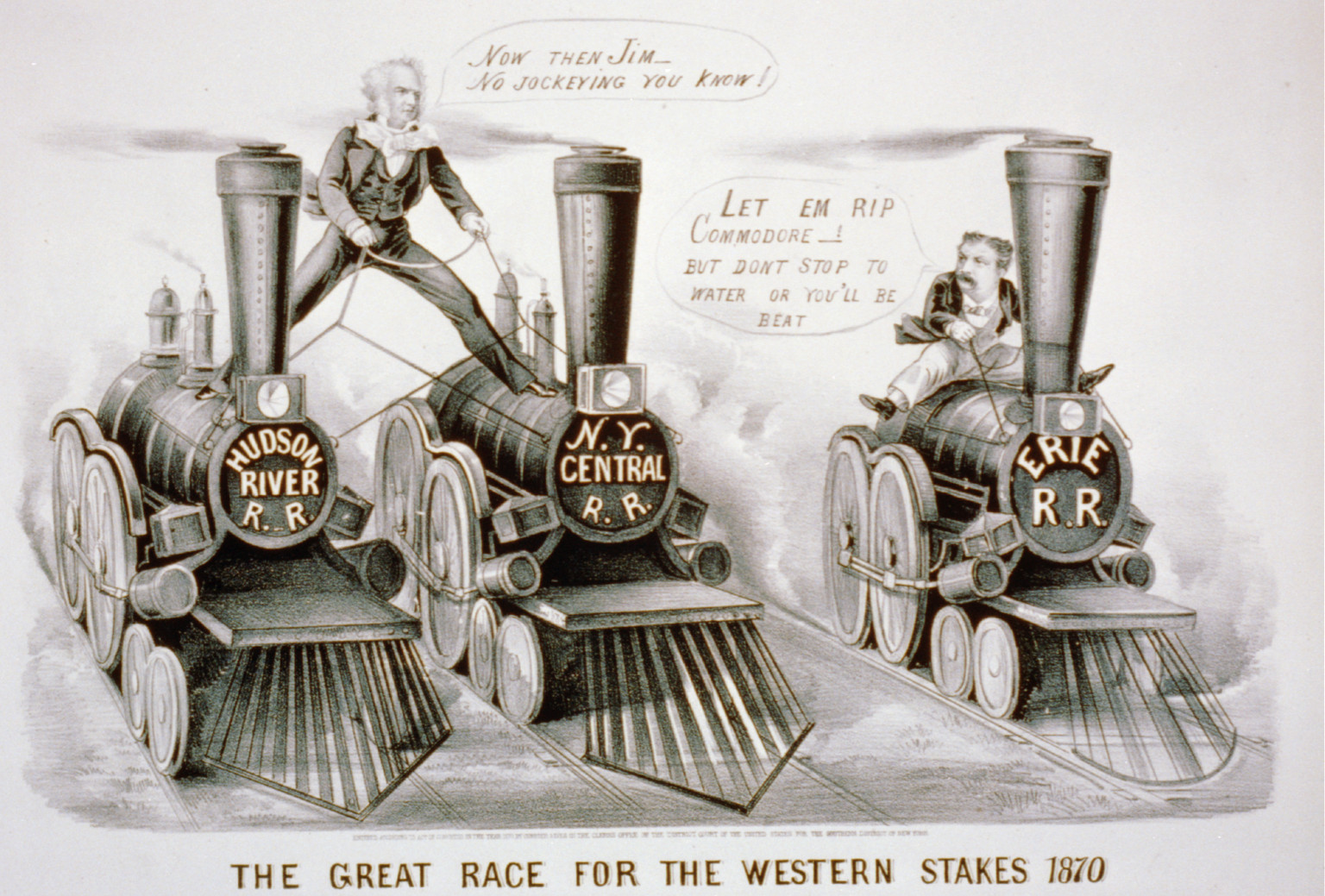
New York railroad row as seen by contemporaries

Gustavus Myers, an American historian and muckraker, wrote in his survey of railroad fortunes in the U.S.

The year 1868 proved a particularly busy one for Vanderbilt. He was engaged in a desperately-devious struggle with Gould. In vain did his agents and lobbyists pour out stacks of money to buy legislative votes enough to defeat the bill legalizing Gould's fraudulent issue of stock. Members of the Legislature impassively took money from both parties. Gould personally appeared at Albany with a satchel containing $500,000 in greenbacks, which were rapidly distributed. One Senator, as was disclosed by an investigating committee, accepted $75,000 from Vanderbilt and then $100,000 from Gould, kept both sums, and voted with the dominant Gould forces.

— Gustavus Myers

Fisk and Gould betrayed Drew, again manipulating the Erie Railroad stock price and causing him to lose $1.5 million. The Panic of 1873 cost him still more, and by 1876, Drew filed for bankruptcy, with debts exceeding a million dollars and no viable assets. He died in 1879, dependent on his son for support.

In September 1869, Fisk and Gould with an accomplice engaged in major manipulation of the gold market, triggering the Black Friday panic of 1869.

After Fisk was murdered in 1872, Gould eventually gained the advantage in the conflict, but he had to relinquish control in 1872–73, following his loss of $1 million worth of Erie Railroad stock (equivalent to $27 million in 2025) to the British confidence man Lord Gordon-Gordon. Public opinion was also hostile to Gould because of his involvement in the 1869 Black Friday stock market crash. In 1878, after all financial swindles and due to continuing mismanagement, the Erie Railway Company declared bankruptcy and was reconstituted as the New York, Lake Erie and Western Railway Company.

== See also ==
- Albany and Susquehanna Railroad
- George G. Barnard – State judge working mostly on behalf of Fisk and Gould, impeached by the Court for the Trial of Impeachments
- Rufus Wheeler Peckham
- "A New War Begins" episode of The Men Who Built America
