= Hoffman House Hotel =

- U.S. National Register of Historic Places
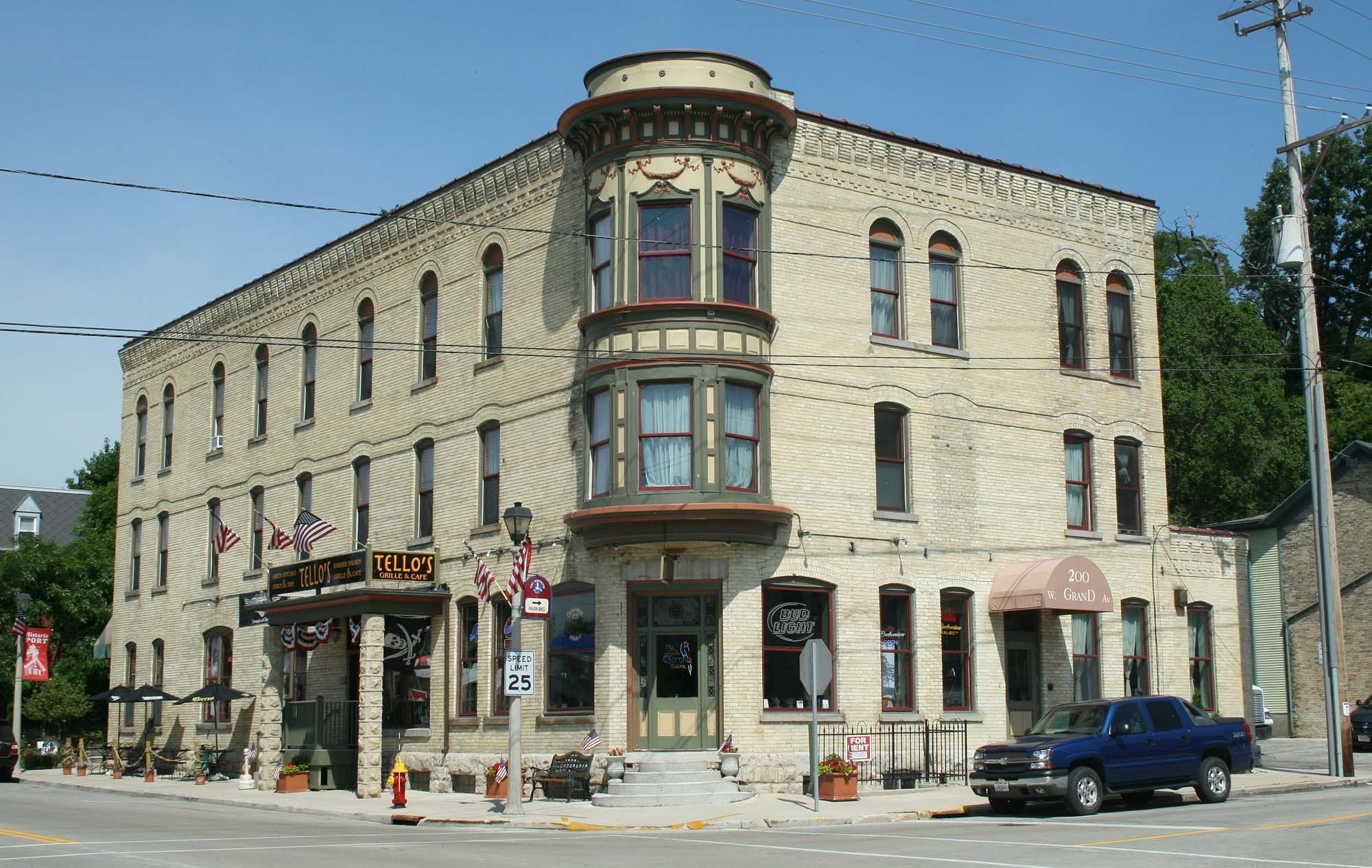
- Hoffman House Hotel

- Location within Wisconsin
- Location: 200 W. Grand Ave. Port Washington, Wisconsin
- Coordinates: 43.38772°N 87.87281°W
- Architectural style: Queen Anne
- NRHP reference No.: 84003773
- Added to NRHP: March 1, 1984

The Hoffman House Hotel is located in Port Washington, Wisconsin. It was added to the National Register of Historic Places in 1984. Currently, the building serves as a restaurant.
