= Joseph Mansfield (journalist) =

American journalist

- Born: abt 1828; Boston, Massachusetts
- Died: 23 Jun 1854; Stockton, California
- Cause of death: murder
- Occupations: Newspaper Editor and Publisher
- Political party: Democrat
- Spouse: Sarah H. Gannett
- Children: Helen Josephine Mansfield
- Parent(s): Joseph Mansfield, Caroline M. Smith

Joseph Mansfield (ca. 1828 – 23 June 1854) was an American newspaper reporter, editor, and publisher.

Mansfield was born about 1828 to Caroline Matilda Smith Mansfield and Joseph Mansfield. He had an older brother, Charles, a younger brother, Stanley, and a younger sister, Caroline.

Mansfield met his future wife, Sarah H. Gannett, when they were both employed at the Boston Transcript, he as an apprentice and she as a "feeder," working the presses. When their daughter Josie was born, the Mansfields lived on Kingston street. Three months later, the family moved to a boarding house at 13 Lincoln St. They later moved to 15 Crescent Place, where they lived for six months.

In 1849 or 1850, Mansfield joined the California gold rush and left his wife and daughter in Boston. Shortly after his arrival in California, he went to work as a compositor on the Stockton Journal. On June 26, 1852, the California Census showed him living in San Joaquin County. By 1853, he had become editor of the San Joaquin Republican. On January 23, 1854, Mansfield became part owner of the newspaper and began to edit it as a voice of the Democratic Party. Mansfield became a close friend of John Bigler during his 1854 gubernatorial race, and promoted Bigler's candidacy in his newspaper.

Meanwhile, also in the early part of 1854, John Tabor took over the Stockton Journal and edited as a voice of the Whig Party. Tabor supported Bigler's rival, George S. Waldo, for Governor of California in the Journal. The columns of these two newspapers were filled every day with rancor for the opposing candidate, and soon the editors began to disparage each other.

On the evening of June 22, 1854, Tabor published an article severely criticizing Joseph Mansfield. The following morning at 9:00 a.m., as Mansfield stood on the corner of Levee and Center Streets talking with J. M. Schofield, the custom house collector, Tabor approached him. As Tabor was about to pass, Mansfield stepped in front of the editor and said, "Young man, I want to tell you what I think of you," while raising his hand. Tabor immediately drew a revolver and fired. The ball struck Mansfield about two inches below his nipple.

Tabor was immediately arrested and confined in the city prison. A mob threatened to break down the prison doors and hang Tabor immediately. Joseph Mansfield died at 2:00 that afternoon. The murder caused a stir throughout California, as both men were well known. Tabor was tried for the murder, was found guilty, and was sentenced to be hanged, March 16, 1855. Prominent citizens, judges, and the legislature sent petitions for pardon to Governor John Bigler. Even the legislature of Texas petitioned for his pardon. The governor finally relented and granted Tabor a full pardon.
