= Business Adventures =

1969 non-fiction book by John Brooks

- Title page for Business Adventures (1969)
- Author: John Brooks
- Language: English
- Genre: Business
- Publisher: Weybright & Talley in NY; Gollancz in London
- Publication date: 1969
- Publication place: United States; United Kingdom
- Media type: Print (hardcover)
- Pages: 400 pp.
- ISBN: 0575003499
- OCLC: 49993
- Dewey Decimal: 338.0973
- LC Class: HG181 .B836 1969

Business Adventures is a 1969 collection of 12 essays written by John Brooks. The essays, all of which were previously published in The New Yorker, deal with financial and corporate life in the United States. In 1963 Harper & Row published The Fate of the Edsel and Other Business Adventures, which contains 3 of the 12 essays published in the 1969 collection.

On July 11, 2014 in an essay published in the Wall Street Journal and slightly later in his blog, Bill Gates proclaimed Business Adventures, recommended to him by Warren Buffett, as "the best business book I've ever read."

The prose is superb: reading Brooks is a supreme pleasure. His writing turns eye-glazing topics (eg, price-fixing scandals in the electronics market) into rollicking narratives. ...
... he tells entertaining stories with richly drawn characters, set during heightened moments within the world of commerce. He invites the readers to draw their own conclusions about best practices. ...
The lessons still apply ...

On July 8, 2014, Open Road Media released an e-book edition entitled Business Adventures: Twelve Classic Tales from the World of Wall Street and in August 2014 offered a paperback edition. In 2014 Penguin Random House Audio released an audiobook of Business Adventures: Twelve Classic Tales from the World of Wall Street narrated by Johnny Heller.

== Table of contents of 2014 edition ==
1. The fluctuation: the little crash in '62
  The story of the Kennedy Slide of 1962 is told.
2. The fate of the Edsel: a cautionary tale
  The essay tells how the Ford Motor Company lost $350 million (in 1960 dollars) in a failed attempt to sell Edsels.
3. The federal income tax: its history and peculiarities
4. A reasonable amount of time: insiders at Texas Gulf Sulphur
5. Xerox Xerox Xerox Xerox
  Bill Gates has made this chapter (which tells the story of the Xerox Corporation's spectacular growth from 1959 to 1967) available for free on his website.
6. Making the customers whole: the death of a president (tale of the Salad Oil Scandal — which was publicly revealed at about the time of the JFK assassination)
7. The impacted philosophers: non-communication at GE
8. The last great corner: a company called Piggly Wiggly
9. A second sort of life: David E. Lilienthal, businessman
10. Stockholder season: annual meetings and corporate power
11. One free bite: a man, his knowledge, and his job
12. In defense of sterling: the bankers, the pound, and the dollar
