= John Brooks (writer) =

American novelist

John Brooks (December 5, 1920 – July 27, 1993) was an American writer and longtime contributor to The New Yorker magazine, where he worked for many years as a staff writer, specializing in financial topics. Brooks was also the author of several books, both fiction and non-fiction, the best known of which was an examination of the financial shenanigans of the 1960s Wall Street bull market.

== Early life ==
John Nixon Brooks was born on December 5, 1920, in New York City, but grew up in Trenton, New Jersey. He graduated from Kent School in Kent, Connecticut in 1938 and Princeton University in 1942. After graduation Brooks joined the United States Army Air Forces, in which he served as a communications and radar officer from 1942 until 1945. He was aboard the First United States Army headquarters ship on D-Day during the Allied invasion of Normandy in 1944.

After leaving the military, Brooks went to work for Time magazine, where he became a contributing editor. He worked at Time for only two years, pining for a chance to write at more length and in a looser style than that dictated by the newsweekly format. In 1949, Brooks got his break. That year he joined The New Yorker as a staff writer – a development he later called the lucky break that made his career. While working at The New Yorker, Brooks also began contributing book reviews to Harper's Magazine and The New York Times Book Review.

Brooks was the author of three novels, one – The Big Wheel, published in 1949 – describing a newsmagazine much like Time. He also published ten non-fiction books on business and finance, the subject in which he specialized for The New Yorker. Brooks's best-known books were Once in Golconda: A True Drama of Wall Street, 1920–1938, about the scandal surrounding Wall Street banker Richard Whitney; The Go-Go Years, on the speculative bubble of Wall Street in the 1960s; The Takeover Game about the merger mania of the 1980s.; and of special note, Business Adventures, which has been cited as Bill Gates' favorite business book. The Go-Go Years earned Brooks the 1974 Gerald Loeb Award for Books.

== Career at The New Yorker ==
Brooks also wrote scores of articles and profiles for The New Yorker, many profiling well-known business figures, and written in an informal and erudite style that turned the accounts of bankers and traders into the stuff of drama. Brooks's best-known New Yorker two-part Annals of Business article was about Henry Ford II and the ill-fated introduction of the most famous failed automotive gambit in history, the Edsel. Brooks also wrote widely on other subjects as well, including the government-guaranteed loans to Chrysler Corporation, the public television show Wall Street Week and its creator Louis Rukeyser, an examination of supply-side economics, the banking behemoth Citibank, economist Arthur Laffer and his Laffer curve, the development of New Jersey's Meadowlands, New York City urban planner Robert Moses, and even the Southern grocery store chain Piggly Wiggly.

Brooks's writing on finance won him three Gerald Loeb Awards, and moved Harvard economist John Kenneth Galbraith to call Brooks's book The Go-Go Years "a small classic in the history of financial insanity".

"He was not a breaker of big stories, or a shaper of important journalistic institutions", wrote journalist Joseph Nocera, now of The New York Times. "He was a wonderful writer, He was that rarest of birds, a gifted storyteller, with an enviable talent for summing up a character with a single, pithy anecdote or sentence."

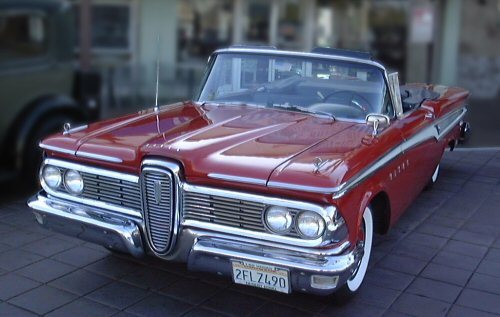
Ford Motor Company's Edsel, subject of author John Brooks's best-known New Yorker profile

Part of Brooks's appeal as a financial journalist was that he wrote for a general-interest publication, The New Yorker. Unlike journalists for more narrowly focused business publications, Brooks realized early on that it was storytelling – and not financial jargon – that would propel readers through his pieces. In his book Once in Golconda, Brooks devoted much of the book to fleshing out the character and peccadilloes of its protagonist, financier Richard Whitney, the aristocratic Morgan broker who headed the New York Stock Exchange, but ended up in Sing Sing Prison for his misdeeds.

"Mr. Brooks has convinced me, absolutely, that Richard Whitney ranks in the highest pantheon of American symbols – like Lincoln and Bryan and Melville and Hemingway and Yellow Kid Weil, Buffalo Bill, Horatio Alger, and even Babe Ruth," wrote TK in Harper's magazine, "In him, the upper-class con crested – and America's last chance to do it right the first time ended."

Brooks's tale of easy credit, inflated egos, financial greed and the end of an era – symbolized by broker Whitney – came to be seen as one of the best accounts of the conditions which led to the Wall Street Crash of 1929. "As Mr. Brooks tells this tale of dishonor, desperation, and the fall of the mighty, it takes on overtones of Greek tragedy, a king brought down by pride. Whitney's sordid history has been told before", said The Wall Street Journal in its review. "But in Mr. Brooks's hands, the drama becomes freshly shocking."

Brooks's account of the bull market of the 1960s in The Go-Go Years similarly delineated the personalities at the center of the action, like high-flying portfolio manager Gerald Tsai. In Brooks's retelling of the decade's events, Tsai and others correctly intuited that the ways of the Street were changing, and adjusted their trading strategies accordingly. Speculation was on the rise, Brooks noted, made easier by the new casino mentality. Writer Michael Lewis noted that Brooks's outrage at the new speculative excesses of the 1960s marked the end of an era.

"The reader Brooks imagines himself to be speaking to is the same shockable character who has vanished from the financial world over the past thirty years", writes Lewis in his preface to a later edition of The Go-Go Years. "Who on Wall Street these days thinks twice about speculation? Who disapproves of such large corporate takeovers? No such person exists, or if he does he's living on some island so remote that no word of the market will ever reach him."

As with previous market booms and busts, much of the new sober hindsight emerged from the rubble of the previous boom. Written during the recession of 1973, Time magazine's review has an eerily familiar ring. "But now that mutual funds are hemorrhaging cash and conglomerate has become a dirty word", opined Time reviewer George Church on October 29, 1973, "the story of the 1960s on Wall Street has the faraway quality of tales from 1929. As New Yorker writer John Brooks points out, the speculative excesses of the decade bore a haunting resemblance to those of the '20s, and they, too, led to a resounding market crash (in 1970) that wiped out fortunes and nearly destroyed Wall Street itself by threatening to bankrupt its biggest brokerage houses."

Brooks's subsequent work, The Takeover Game, limned the precincts of the greenmailers and junk bond pioneers of the 1980s. The book, noted Business Week's editor-in-chief Stephen B. Shepard in his New York Times review, managed "to be both scholarly and provocative." With his facile explanations of complex financial terms and invigorating portraits of market speculators, The Takeover Game "argues that the investment banks, motivated by huge fees, are the driving force behind the current merger mania – usually to the detriment of the commonweal. It is little more than a speculative frenzy reminiscent of the 1920s, Mr. Brooks believes, built on high-risk debt euphemistically called leverage."

"Come the next recession," Business Week editor Shepard wrote prophetically, "the debtors will default, throwing both the stock market and the economy into a tailspin."

In a field known for bone-dry adjectives, writer Brooks lent his business writing a new panache. In describing Ford's Edsel, for instance, Brooks wrote in his best-known New Yorker essay that the newly engineered vehicle was "clumsy, powerful, dowdy, gauche, well-meaning – a deKooning woman."

In a field starved for vigorous writing, colorful characters and invigorating plot lines, Brooks's prose was seen by contemporary critics as a long-overdue tonic. But seen from today's vantage, many of Brooks's assumptions seem almost quaint, writes The New Yorker's current financial writer James Surowiecki. On reading Brooks's The Seven Fat Years several decades later, Brooks's account of the managing of General Motors's first-ever secondary offering in 1955, "the business world Brooks describes seems so oddly innocent, so unvoracious that he could just as well be talking about children playing Monopoly."

In his New Yorker portrait of public television's groundbreaking business host Louis Rukeyser, Brooks paid tribute to another gimlet-eyed observer of Wall Street's follies. "His airy and adroit handling of his big-shot guests is a pleasure to watch", wrote Brooks in his revealing portrait of Rukeyser, who had a "knack for providing entertainment unrivaled by any other television commentator on economic matters, past or present."

Ironically, some of Brooks's most telling observations were about his own employer: The New Yorker, a magazine which guarded its privacy so zealously that it did not publish its telephone number. Such quaint business practices were bound to endear it to writer Brooks, who called The New Yorker's business model "so bad it's good."

When it came to the Ford Motor Company's hapless Edsel, Brooks revealed in his two-part series in The New Yorker that the Dearborn-based eponymous auto company had introduced the new model without much research. The only research done on the brand before its splashy introduction, Brooks noted, was simply on its name—which the Ford Executive Committee then proceeded to ignore. The naming of the brand, in Brooks's trademark trenchant style, carried echoes of the patent medicine salesmen of the nineteenth century.

"Science was curtly discarded at the last minute and the Edsel was named for the father of the Company's president, like a nineteenth-century brand of cough drops or saddle soap. As for the design, it was arrived at without even a pretense of consulting the polls, and by the method that has been standard for years in the designing of automobiles – that of simply pooling the hunches of sundry company committees."

"Instead of spending millions on listening and learning about the market," Brooks wrote of Ford's executives, "it spent millions on a campaign to launch the product it had developed in isolation. In this sense, the Edsel story is a classic of what so often goes wrong in a silo-based enterprise: Organization and ego got in the way of sound decision making."

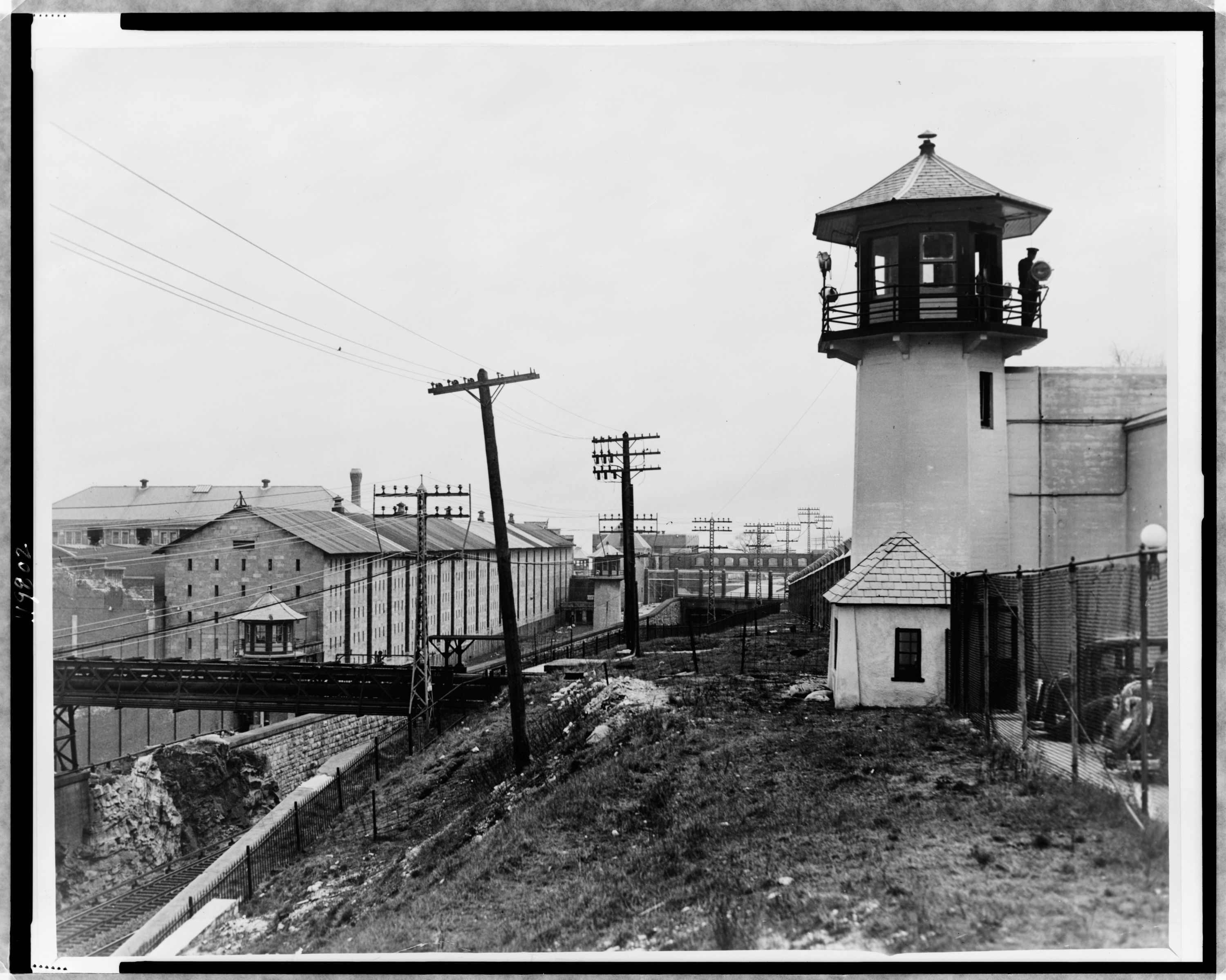
Sing Sing Prison old cell block housed Richard Whitney, former President of New York Stock Exchange, profiled in author John Brooks's Once in Golconda

Such words today seem commonplace, but when Brooks was writing it was commonplace for financial writers to simply pull corporate press releases off the wires and massage them gently into 'journalism.' Among the first of a new breed of financial journalist, unafraid to lift the manhole covers to peer underneath, Brooks's copy was, at the time, revolutionary. In his portrait of portfolio manager Gerry Tsai, for instance, Brooks described the go-go operator as "so swift and nimble in getting into and out of specific stocks that his relations with them, far from resembling a marriage or even a companionate marriage, were often more like that of a roue with a chorus line."

Brooks did not limit his writing to business topics. In a 1983 book review in The New York Times, Brooks wrote that author David Burnham, in his The Rise of the Computer State, noted that the "apocalyptic vision" painted by writer Burnham was nearly at hand. The rise of the state's technological prowess was such, wrote Brooks, that "it is because one feels powerless against the advance of the national electronic eye and ear."

In his interviews of his subjects, and in his writing, Brooks sometimes dropped in passages from Virginia Woolf, or alluded to paintings by Marcel Duchamp or theater reviews by English critic Kenneth Tynan. In 1950, the former newsweekly writer and aspiring novelist Brooks reviewed Jack Kerouac's The Town and the City in The New York Times. Brooks subsequently reviewed The Deer Park, the new novel by writer Norman Mailer that was rejected for publication by Mailer's original publisher for obscenity. Thanks to his wide-ranging style and eclectic mind, Brooks emerged as "the only writer of business books and articles with a large and assured readership of nonprofessionals."

Part of Brooks's appeal to the readers of The New Yorker, accustomed to prose by the likes of John Updike, may have been his singular voice and contrarian nature. Writing about the paucity of women on Wall Street, for instance, Brooks noted the dining policies of the Street's stuffier precincts barred women from dining there, and "even more astonishing... was the fact that many of the public restaurants in the area did not take advantage of the situation by encouraging women, but rather fell in line with the clubs by banning them.... Without a reservation or a long wait, a woman could scarcely get a decent lunch anywhere in the area at any price."

== Professional organizations and later years ==
Brooks also used his knowledge of business and finance to help other authors. He served as president of the Authors Guild for four years, from 1975 until 1979, and along with fellow New Yorker writer John Hersey was instrumental in creating a recommended book contract for authors. Brooks also served as vice president of PEN for four years, a vice president of the Society of American Historians and a trustee of the New York Public Library from 1978 until 1993.

Brooks was married for the last 10 years of his life to the former Barbara Mahoney. He was previously married to the former Rae Everitt, with whom he had two children. He died in East Hampton, Long Island, New York, on July 27, 1993, of complications from a stroke.

== Awards ==
- 1964 Gerald Loeb Award for Magazines for "The Fluctuation"
- 1969 Gerald Loeb Award for Magazines for "In Defense of Sterling"
- 1974 Gerald Loeb Special Book Award for "Money Game"

== Bibliography ==
=== Non-fiction ===
- The Seven Fat Years: Chronicles of Wall Street (1958)

Wall Street during the boom years of the 1950s

- The One and the Many: The Individual in the Modern World (1962) (editor)

The Second Corning Conference with essays by Charles Habib Malik, Raymond Aron, Roger M. Bough, McGeorge Bundy, Kenneth O. Dike, August Heckscher, Julian Hochfeld

- The Fate of the Edsel and Other Business Adventures (1963)
- The Great Leap: The Past Twenty-Five Years in America (1966)
- Business Adventures (1969)
- Once in Golconda: A True Drama of Wall Street, 1920–1938 (1969)

The Wall Street Crash of 1929 and its aftershocks

- The Go-Go Years: The Drama and Crashing Finale of Wall Street’s Bullish 60’s (1973)
- The Autobiography of American Business: The Story Told By Those Who Made It (1974)

Personal narratives by Alfred P. Sloan, Andrew Carnegie, William Zeckendorf, Henry Ford, Helena Rubinstein, Bernard Baruch, David E. Lilienthal, and others

- Telephone: The First Hundred Years (1976)
- The Games Players: Tales of Men and Money (1980)
- Showing Off in America: From Conspicuous Consumption to Parody Display (1981)
- The Takeover Game: The Men, the Moves and the Wall Street Money Behind Today's Nationwide Merger Wars (1987)

=== Novels ===
- The Big Wheel (1950)

Behind the scenes on a big weekly news magazine

- A Pride of Lions (1954)

Tom Osborne returns to his small hometown of East Bank from Manhattan and confronts the clannish attitudes of his family and community

- The Man Who Broke Things (1958)

Tycoon Hank Haislip prioritizes power over personal relationships in 1950s New York proxy fight for The Great Eastern Company

=== Notable articles ===
- "The Title-Backfire". The New Yorker. 25 (49): 67–68. January 28, 1950.
- "The Kicker". The New Yorker. 60 (47): 44–57. January 7, 1985.

== See also ==
- The New Yorker
- Gerald Loeb Award
