= Josie Mansfield =

American lover (1847–1931)

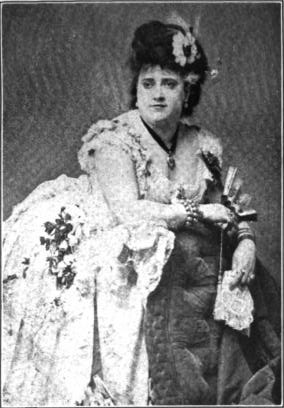
- Helen Josephine Mansfield Lawlor
- Born: Helen Josephine Mansfield; December 15, 1847; Boston, Massachusetts, U.S.
- Died: October 27, 1931 (aged 83); Paris, France
- Resting place: Montparnasse Cemetery
- Occupation: Actress
- Height: 5' 5.5"
- Spouse(s): John Lawlor (m. 1864; div. 1866) Robert L. Reade (m. 1891; div. 1895)
- Parent(s): Joseph Mansfield; Sarah H. Gannett

Helen Josephine Mansfield (December 15, 1847 – October 27, 1931), known professionally as Josie Mansfield, was an American stage actress. Mansfield is best known for being at the center of a fatal love triangle involving two wealthy, high profile men: financier Jim Fisk and his business partner Ned Stokes.

== Early life ==
Mansfield was a descendant of many colonial families of Massachusetts, most notably John Alden, and was a distant cousin of Frank Gannett. She was born in 1847 on Kingston Street in Boston, Massachusetts, the first and only child of Sarah H. Gannett Mansfield and Joseph Mansfield, who had both been employed at the Boston Transcript. When Josie Mansfield was about three months old, her parents moved to a boarding house at 13 Lincoln Street. They later moved to 15 Crescent Place, where they lived for six months.

In 1849 or 1850, Joseph Mansfield joined the California gold rush. On August 12, 1850, the U.S. Census shows Josie Mansfield, 3, living in Boston Ward 8 with her uncle, Charles H. Mansfield, 26, her grandmother Caroline Mansfield, 50, and her aunt Caroline Mansfield, 19. The absence of Sarah Gannett Mansfield suggests that she may have been in California with her husband.

On the morning of June 23, 1854, Joseph Mansfield was murdered on the streets of Stockton, California, by a business rival.

After her father's death, Mansfield moved with her mother Sarah back East to the Charlestown district of Boston and lived on Mystic Street, near the Bunker Hill Monument. Charles Mansfield, Joseph's brother, also lived in Charlestown at the time of his brother's death, and reportedly took a great interest in his widowed sister-in-law. He invited Sarah and Josie to live with him. The 1855 Massachusetts Census lists Charles H. Mansfield, 32, living with Sarah H. Mansfield, 26, and Hellen J. Mansfield (Josie), 8. On October 27, 1856, Charles and Sarah married in Charlestown, Massachusetts.

According to Barbara Goldsmith, "Josie would later say that her stepfather sexually molested her when she was twelve and continued to do so for three years, threatening to maim her if she ever spoke of it. Josie did not tell her mother, who by this time was drinking heavily."

On July 21, 1860, the United States Census shows Charles Mansfield, 40, fish dealer, living in Charlestown with Sarah Mansfield, 38, Josephine Mansfield, 14, and Lizzy Spillard, 27, an Irish-born house keeper. At the time, Charles owned $5,000 worth of real estate and $1,000 worth of personal estate.

Josie Mansfield attended school in Charlestown, where she was very popular, especially with the boys. She had dark eyes, dark wavy hair, and ruddy cheeks. Her plump, well-developed figure was flattered by the shorter hemlines (that often revealed a glimpse of petticoat) and higher heels that were fashionable at the time.

Goldsmith wrote that "By the time Josie was fifteen, her stepfather was selling her to other men." Charles Mansfield frequently stayed home while his wife Sarah loved to dress up and go into town. Charles eventually discovered secret letters from Sarah's admirers and filed for divorce.

== First marriage ==
Sarah Mansfield sailed to California after her divorce, and rented a house on Bryant Street in San Francisco with her daughter Josie. James D. Carter was the owner of the property adjoining Mansfield's. Carter had a transport business and had accumulated a fortune. He became infatuated with Josie Mansfield, and he proposed marriage. Her mother objected because of her daughter's age. Carter proposed that Josie Mansfield should go to the convent of Notre Dame at San Jose, about fifty miles from San Francisco, and finish her education. He offered to pay her expenses until she was of age, and then marry her. Mansfield was sent to the convent. Her mother married a professional gambler named Richard Warren. Mansfield left her boarding school and returned to her mother. In San Francisco, Mansfield met Frank Lawlor, an actor, who was then performing at the San Francisco Opera House.

D. W. Perley, the wealthy English law partner of Judge David S. Terry, began calling at the Warren home, and became attracted to Mansfield. According to Goldsmith, Richard Warren "forced her to have intercourse with...Perley, after which he popped out from under the bed, pointed a loaded pistol at Perley's head, and demanded $500." Perley went to the bank after his escape and stopped payment of the check. At Perley's instigation, the San Francisco newspapers published the details of the event, describing it as a conspiracy between the Lawlors and the Warrens.

Lawlor claimed to have been in Virginia City, Nevada at the time of the Perley incident. When he returned to San Francisco, Mansfield told him all about it, and begged him for protection from her stepfather. According to Lawlor, Mansfield insisted that he marry her.

Mansfield and Lawlor married on September 1, 1864, when Mansfield was 16. In January 1865, the couple left San Francisco. The Lawlors moved to Washington, DC, and Philadelphia before settling in New York. They separated, and after several months, they divorced in 1866. Mansfield tried to start a career as an actress, but failed to find work.

== Relationship with Jim Fisk ==
By 1867, Josie Mansfield had become so impoverished that she had only one presentable dress and despaired of ever paying the overdue rent on her tiny room on Lexington Avenue. She began spending time at the home of her friend Annie Wood on 34th Street. There, in November 1867, she met Jim Fisk, a wealthy financier who was known for handing out $100 bills to women who caught his eye. Mansfield rebuffed Fisk's advances and refused his money for three months, increasing his desire for her and her value. Then she allowed him to pay her overdue rent, after which he moved her into the American Club Hotel suite.

Fisk eventually bought Mansfield an elegant home at 18 West 24th, furnished it, and supplied her with everything she desired. The four-story brownstone (after some $65,000 worth of improvements) had four servants, a wardrobe filled with dresses, and a jewelry case accented by real jewels. The home was a few doors down from Fisk's Grand Opera House and Erie Railroad headquarters at 359 W. 23rd, and Fisk had a covered passage built linking the back doors of the headquarters and Mansfield's brownstone.

In January 1868, just three months after meeting him, Mansfield visited Fisk at his Erie Railroad offices. The visit provoked a rebuke from Fisk: "Strange you should make my office or the vicinity the scene for a 'personal.' You must be aware that harm came to me in such foolish vanity, and those that could do it care but little for the interest of the writer of this."

In addition to the dresses, Fisk gave Mansfield $50,000 in cash and about $250,000 in Tiffany emeralds. Mansfield had her hair done daily, and every two weeks she had a skin treatment of bismuth and arsenic to keep her skin white. In one year, Fisk spent $30,000 to equip Mansfield. Besides the emeralds, he gave her a diamond necklace, earrings, and tiara, pearls, corals, medallions, and twenty five rings. In November 1868, nine months after they met, the Springfield (Massachusetts) Republican published an exposé of Fisk's relationship with Mansfield.

== Relationship with Ned Stokes ==
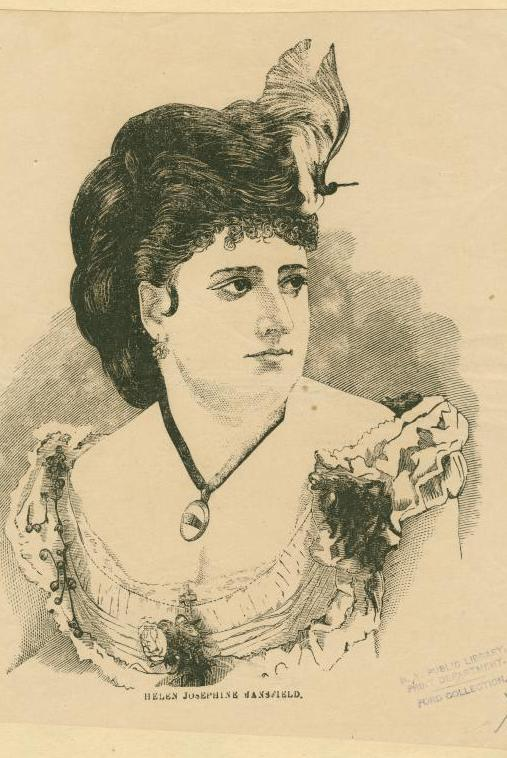
Wallach Division: Print Collection. Helen Josephine Mansfield, 1872

Edward "Ned" Stokes operated an oil refinery in Brooklyn at Hunter's Point. Fisk, who operated the Erie Railroad, was Stokes' "silent partner" and had a secret arrangement with Stokes to discount freight charges for the refinery. On New Year's Day 1870, Mansfield hosted an open house. Fisk invited Stokes to join him at the party and there introduced him to Mansfield. Stokes became a frequent visitor to Mansfield's home.

Mansfield likely tried to extort money from Fisk with the threat of ending their relationship and deserting him for Stokes. Fisk resisted giving her a settlement. On January 29, 1870, Josie sent Fisk a letter ending their relationship. Fisk went to Stokes to request that Stokes stop seeing Mansfield. Stokes favored letting Mansfield decide between them. Mansfield declined to decide, stating that she didn't see why they couldn't all be friends. Fisk replied that "You can't run two engines on one track in contrary directions at the same time."

Mansfield and Fisk made up and broke up again. Fisk began spending time with Céline Montaland, a French soprano, and Fisk was aware that Mansfield was still seeing Stokes.

Because she was unable to extort money from Fisk herself, Mansfield delivered their love letters to Stokes. Several lawsuits took place between the three parties, and Fisk was prosecuted for libel by Mansfield, because he had a former servant of hers make an affidavit that he overheard Mansfield and Stokes conspiring to get money from Fisk.

In January 1871, Fisk arranged to have Stokes arrested for embezzling funds from the refinery. He also took over the refinery by force and obtained injunctions to prevent Stokes and his mother, who owned the site, from entering the premises. The charge was dismissed and Stokes was later awarded $10,000 compensation. Stokes was dissatisfied with the award and threatened to publish incriminating letters from Fisk unless he was paid substantially more. Fisk obtained another injunction to prevent the publication, claiming he was being blackmailed.

On January 6, 1872, Stokes learned that Fisk was on his way to the Grand Central Hotel. He knew that Fisk always entered by the ladies entrance, so Stokes went in first and waited on the second floor landing. When he heard Fisk climbing the stairs, Stokes started down. Stokes fired two shots at Fisk from a Colt pistol, hitting him once in the abdomen and once in the left arm. Stokes tried to flee but was captured.

Fisk died of the abdominal wound the next morning after giving a dying declaration identifying Stokes as the killer.

== Aftermath of murder ==
Thirty-nine letters from Fisk to Mansfield were published in the New York Herald one week after Jim Fisk's death. They contained no insight into Fisk's business dealings, just evidence of his love for Mansfield and his jealousy of Stokes.

Mansfield sued Fisk's widow for $200,000 that she claimed Fisk owed her, but she lost the suit. Mansfield went to Boston, where crowds followed her and hooted her in the streets.

On the morning of July 22, 1872, Mansfield went to Saratoga Springs, New York, to testify in the Court of Impeachment concerning Fisk's relations with Judge George G. Barnard. She was refused accommodation at the Grand Union Hotel and at least one other first-class hotel in the city. When she took a seat in the courtroom, several local women walked out.

In September 1872, Mansfield applied for a passport. Her passport application describes her as 5 feet 5 1/2 inches (166.4 cm) tall, with a high forehead, an aquiline nose, a small mouth, dark brown hair, a light complexion, and an oval face.

== Relationship with Ella Wesner ==
In 1873, Mansfield left New York for Paris, France, with Ella Wesner, a male impersonator in vaudeville. The event evoked considerable scandal; it was discussed in most of the major metropolitan newspapers and journals in New York, Chicago, and other major American cities. In Paris, Mansfield and Wesner presided over a salon at the Café Américan. Wesner returned to the United States alone in the spring of 1873.

== Mid life ==
On September 4, 1873, Mansfield was being treated for life-threatening cancer in Paris. On November 27, 1874, Mansfield returned to New York on the Parthia from Liverpool, England.

On May 19, 1888, The New York Times reported that Mansfield was dead and had been secretly buried in Beverly, New Jersey, but a reporter tracked her down at her residence near the Boulevard Pereire in Paris.

The 1891 U.S. $1,000 silver certificate, known as the Courtesan Note, depicts the image of a woman that was based on a photograph of Josie Mansfield.

== Later years ==
In October 1891, Mansfield married Robert Livingstone Reade, an expatriate American lawyer, at St George's church, Hanover Square, London. Reade was a brother of Katherine Strachan and Mary Reade Cary, Lady Falkland. His mother and three members of the bride's family were present at the wedding. The couple spent their honeymoon at Brighton. They divorced on August 1, 1895. Josie was living at 53 Rue Empere, Paris, and Robert was living at the Hotel Brighton.

During her later life, several stories appeared in newspapers claiming that Mansfield was sick and poor and living with siblings, although she was an only child. One story claimed that Mansfield lived in Boston from 1896 to 1899, calling herself "Mrs. Josie Welton." The same article claimed that Mansfield was paralyzed on her right side, and was going to live with her "sister" in Philadelphia. Another article claimed that from 1902 through 1909, Mansfield was living as "Mrs. Mary Lawler" with a "brother" in Watertown, South Dakota. Somehow she returned to Paris where she lived for many years.

== Death ==
In 1931, while shopping at a department store in Paris, Mansfield collapsed. She was taken to the American Hospital in Neuilly-sur-Seine, where she died at the age of 83. Her physician, Dr. G. M. Converse, certified the cause of death as stomach cancer. She was buried on October 29, 1931, as Mrs. Helen Josephine Mansfield Reade, in a grave beside her mother's in historic Montparnasse Cemetery on the southern heights of Paris. Two servants and a friend attended her service at the American Cathedral of the Holy Trinity and her burial. The friend may have been Mr. A. D. Weil, who is listed on her death certificate as accompanying her effects.
