= Belknap Township, Pottawattamie County, Iowa =

Belknap Township
- Census-designated place
- Location in Iowa
- Coordinates: 41°30′34″N 95°44′13″W
- Country: United States
- State: Iowa
- County: Pottawattamie
- Time zone: Central (CST)

Belknap Township is a township in Pottawattamie County, Iowa, United States.

== History ==
Belknap Township is named for William W. Belknap.

== See also ==
- Gen. William Worth Belknap House
