= Belknap Township =

Belknap Township may refer to:

- Belknap Township, Pottawattamie County, Iowa
- Belknap Township, Michigan
