= Trader post scandal =

Corruption scandal in the United States

The trader post scandal, or Indian Ring, took place during Reconstruction and involved Secretary of War William W. Belknap and his wives receiving kickback payments from a Fort Sill tradership contract.

In 1870, Belknap was granted the sole power to appoint and license sutlers with ownership rights to highly lucrative "traderships" at U.S. military forts on the Western frontier. Belknap appointed a New York contractor (Caleb P. Marsh) to the trader post at Fort Sill which was already held by John S. Evans. An illicit partnership contract authorized by Belknap was drawn up which allowed Evans to keep the tradership at Fort Sill provided that he make payments to Marsh, who in turn split those payments with Belknap's wife.

In 1876, a Congressional investigation discovered that profits from the Fort Sill tradership were split among Belknap, Marsh, Evans, and two of Belknap's wives, Carita and Amanda. On March 2, 1876, Belknap tendered his resignation as Secretary of War to President Ulysses S. Grant. Despite the resignation, the House of Representatives voted unanimously for Belknap's impeachment and forwarded the articles of impeachment to the Senate. In May 1876, after lengthy debate, the Senate voted that Belknap, a private citizen, could be put on trial by the Senate. Belknap was acquitted when the vote for conviction failed to achieve the required two-thirds majority. Most of the senators who voted against conviction expressed the belief that the Senate had overstepped its authority in attempting to convict a private citizen.

The Congressional investigation created a rift between Grant and Col. George A. Custer. During the investigation, Custer testified on hearsay evidence that President Grant's brother, Orvil, was involved in the trader post rings. This infuriated President Grant who then stripped Custer of his command in the campaign against the Dakota Sioux. Although Custer was later permitted to participate in the campaign against the Dakota Sioux, Custer's reputation had been damaged. While attempting to restore his military prestige in the U.S. Army, Custer was killed in action at the Battle of the Little Bighorn. Belknap had allowed the sale of superior military weapons to hostile Native Americans at trader posts, while having supplied soldiers in the U.S. Army defective military weapons. This upset the balance of firepower between Indians and U.S. soldiers, and may have contributed to the defeat of the U.S. military at the Battle of Little Bighorn.

== Belknap appointed Secretary of War ==
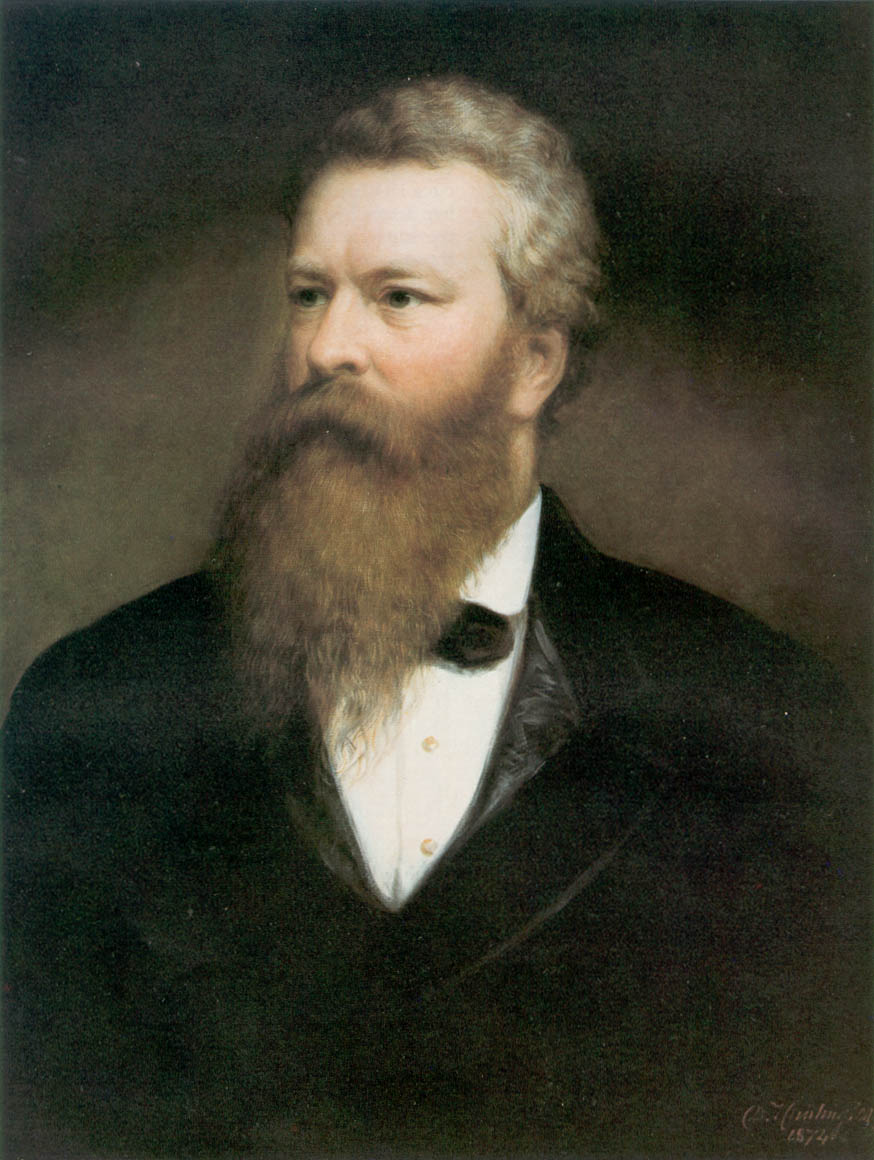
William W. Belknap, Secretary of War from 1869 to 1876

A native of New York, and Iowa attorney, William W. Belknap entered the American Civil War in 1861 fighting for the Union. Belknap, having efficiently served at Shiloh and Atlanta, was appointed major general by the end of the war. Belknap was known for serving coolly under pressure at Shiloh and for bravely attacking a Confederate breastwork at Atlanta. At the war's end in 1865, Belknap retired from the military and was appointed internal revenue collector in Keokuk; having served until 1869. After Secretary of War John A. Rawlins died in 1869, President Ulysses S. Grant appointed Belknap to head the War Department. Grant believed Belknap had served with honor and deserved a cabinet position.

=== Tradership monopolies established ===
At the beginning of the war, Union soldiers began purchasing supplies from private vendors known as "sutlers". These sutlers set up trading posts inside U.S. Army forts and were chosen by the regimental officers to do business. This policy changed in 1870 when Secretary of War Belknap lobbied Congress to pass a law vesting sole authority in the War Department to license and choose sutlers at Western military forts. The authority previously granted to U.S. Army regimental officers, at the individual forts, was revoked. Both U.S. Army soldiers and Indians shopped and bought supplies at these traderships. These traderships controlled by Sec. Belknap became lucrative monopolies and were considered profitable investments during the 1870s.

=== Weapons sold to Indians ===
During Belknap's tenure, American Indians authorized by Grant's Indian peace policy were sold top of the line breech-loaders and repeating rifles at the tradership posts on the Western frontier. Violence on the Western frontier decreased starting in 1870 and lasting until 1875. The money Indians used to purchase weapons came from federal appropriations to keep Indians pacified. To increase profits, Belknap forced soldiers to only buy supplies from tradership monopolies at exorbitant prices, leaving them destitute. This policy caught the ire of Col. George Custer, stationed at Fort Lincoln, who discovered most of the actual profits from the traderships were going to investors rather than the licensed sutlers. Belknap supplied soldiers with defective breechloading rifles that jammed after the third round. This discrepancy in military weapons between hostile Indians and the U.S. military was considered by one historian to be a significant factor in the defeat of the U.S. Military at the Battle of the Little Big Horn in 1876.

=== Fort Sill ===
Fort Sill depicted in the May 13, 1876 edition of Harper's Illustrated Weekly

In August 1870, Carita S. Tomlinson, the second wife of Belknap, lobbied on behalf of Caleb P. Marsh, to receive a tradership. Having filled out and submitted an application on August 16, Sec. Belknap's War Department awarded Marsh a tradership at Fort Sill in the Oklahoma Territory. John S. Evans, the experienced sutler already at Fort Sill, appointed on October 10, 1870, did not want to give up his lucrative trader post to Marsh. An illicit financial arrangement, approved by Belknap, was made where Evans would keep the tradership and give Marsh quarterly payments amounting to $12,000 per year. Marsh then split this profit in half; giving $6,000 per year to Sec. Belknap's wife Carita in quarterly payments. Evans would keep the remaining profits from the Fort Sill tradership.

Carita came from a wealthy Kentucky family and was used to living in opulence. It is believed that the kickback payments were intended to support this lavish lifestyle. However, Carita lived to receive only one payment. She died in December 1870 from tuberculosis, one month after giving birth to her child. After Carita's death, Sec. Belknap and Carita's sister, Amanda Tomlinson Bower, who had previously moved in with Carita and Belknap, personally continued to take quarterly profit payments from Marsh. Belknap eventually married Amanda in December 1873 and she became known as the "Queen" among cabinet member wives. Caleb Marsh was the husband of one of Amanda's closest friends. Amanda had, just as her sister Carita, enjoyed an opulent lifestyle that cost a considerable amount of money during the Gilded Age. Belknap's $8,000 yearly salary was unable to support his third wife's lavish spending habits. When suspicious people asked Belknap how he could afford such a high standard of living on his salary, Belknap stated that Amanda, a wealthy widow, had received money from her deceased husband's estate. In total, Sec. Belknap received more than $20,000 in payments derived from the Fort Sill tradership. According to Congressional testimony, Belknap received money from other trading posts, as well.

== House investigation ==
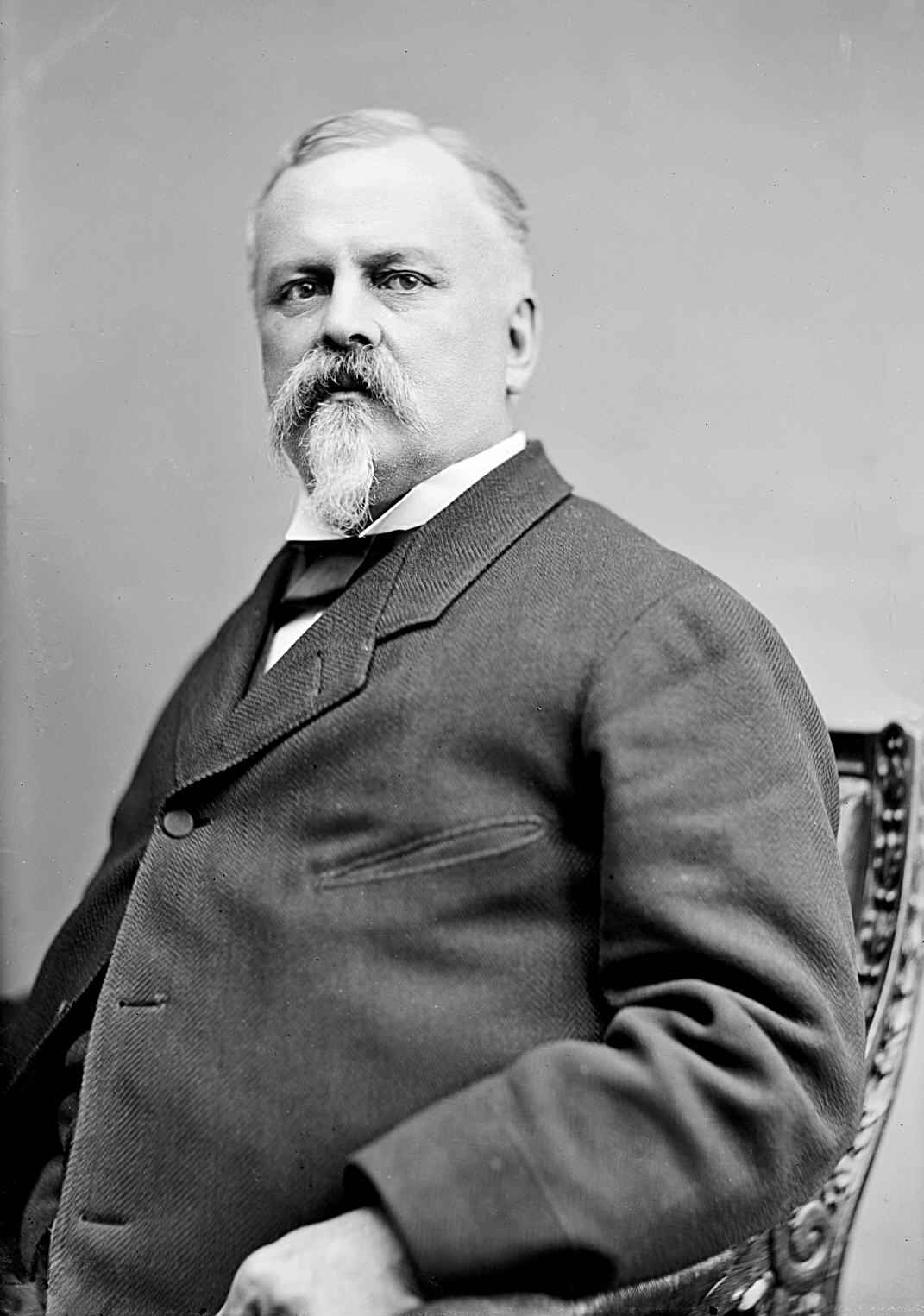
U.S. Rep. Hiester Clymer

National attention was drawn to the plight of American Indians in 1874 when paleontologist Othniel Marsh revealed that the Lakota Sioux had "frayed blankets, rotten beef and concrete-hard flour." Secretary of Interior Columbus Delano, responsible for Indian Bureau policy, resigned from office in 1875. The New York Herald, a Democratic newspaper, reported rumors that Belknap was receiving kickback money from tradership posts. On February 29, 1876, during the Great Sioux War and a Presidential election year, Democratic Representative Hiester Clymer, a critic of Republican Reconstruction, launched an investigation into corruption in the War Department. The Democratic Party had recently obtained a majority in the House of Representatives and immediately had begun a series of vigorous investigations into corruption charges of the Grant Administration. Clymer's committee did not have far to look for corruption, and information was soon gathered from witness testimony that Belknap and his wives had received illicit payments from the Fort Sill tradership contract. Apparently, Clymer, who was friends with Belknap, advised Belknap to resign office to keep him from going to prison. Belknap hired an attorney, Montgomery Blair. Belknap defended himself by acknowledging that the payments took place, however, he stated that the financial arrangements were instigated by his two wives, unknown to himself. Clymer, however, had an informant, Caleb Marsh, who exposed the Fort Sill ring under Congressional testimony. Marsh testified under oath that he had made payments directly to Belknap and that Belknap gave Marsh receipts for these payments.

=== Resignation of Belknap ===
Belknap with his counsel, Blair, testified before the Clymer Committee on February 29, 1876. Belknap then withdrew from further testimony, and his attorney Blair proposed Congress drop charges against his client if Belknap resigned. The Clymer committee, however, was in no mood for compromise and declined. On March 2, Rep. Lyman K. Bass informed former Solicitor General and current Treasury Secretary Benjamin Bristow, who informed Secretary of State Hamilton Fish, who in turn told him to tell President Grant. When Bristow reached the White House, Grant was eating breakfast and getting ready for a studio portrait session with Henry Ulke. Bristow told Grant of Belknap's tradership scheme and suggested he speak with Bass for further information. After Bristow left, Grant scheduled an afternoon meeting with Bass. He then began to leave for Ulke's studio when he was interrupted by Belknap and Interior Secretary Zachariah Chandler in the White House's Red Room. Weeping, the burly Belknap prostrated himself before Grant and confessed to the kickback scheme, blaming his two wives. Belknap begged the President to accept his resignation. Moved by Belknap's emotional plea, Grant personally wrote and accepted Belknap's resignation at 10:20 a.m., much to Belknap's relief. Immediately after, Senators Lot Morrill and Oliver Morton intercepted Grant and advised him not to accept Belknap's resignation; however, Belknap had already resigned.

=== Belknap impeached by House ===
Despite Belknap's resignation, the House voted to impeach the former Secretary of War. House members, however, argued over whether they had a right to impeach Belknap, now a private citizen. Democratic Rep. Blackburn criticized Grant for accepting Belknap's resignation. A false rumor spread that Belknap had committed suicide. The House passed five articles of impeachment, to be presented to the Senate for trial.

=== Custer testimony ===
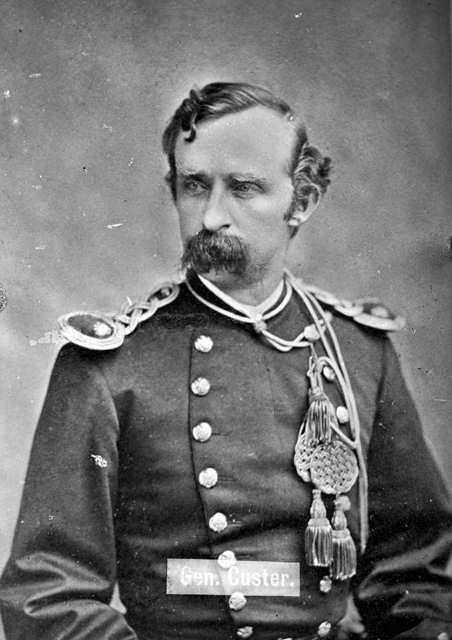
Col. George A. Custer

Clymer continued his investigation into Belkamp's War Department, having called upon Col. George A. Custer, stationed at Fort Lincoln, who testified in Washington, D.C., on March 29 and April 4. Custer was rumored to have anonymously aided the New York Herald in their investigation into Indian Traderpost rings, particularly a March 31 New York Herald article, titled "Belknap's Anachonda". Custer testified to Clymer's committee that sutlers (military post traders) gave a percentage of their profits to Belknap. Custer had initially become suspicious in 1875 as his men at Fort Lincoln were paying high prices for supplies, and then found out the sutler at the fort was being paid only $2,000 out of the tradership's $15,000 in profits. Custer believed that the $13,000 difference went to partners in the tradership, or to Belknap himself. Custer said he had heard that Grant's brother, Orvil, was involved in the tradership rings, having invested in three posts with the President's authorization. Grant was offended by the mention of Orvil Grant's name in that context. Custer also testified that Col. William B. Hazen had been sent to a remote post, Fort Buford, as punishment for Hazen having exposed Belknap's traderpost rings in 1872. This angered Philip Sheridan, who wrote to the War Department and contradicted Custer's claims, including concerning Hazen's reputed banishment. Sheridan had been a staunch supporter of Custer until his testimony before the Clymer committee. Although Custer's lengthy testimony was mostly hearsay, his reputation as military commander impressed the Clymer committee, Secretary of State Hamilton Fish, William T. Sherman, and the American press, and added significant weight to the hearings. Belknap, despite his resignation, had strong connections in Washington, D.C., and used his influence to discredit Custer's testimony.

== Response of President Grant ==
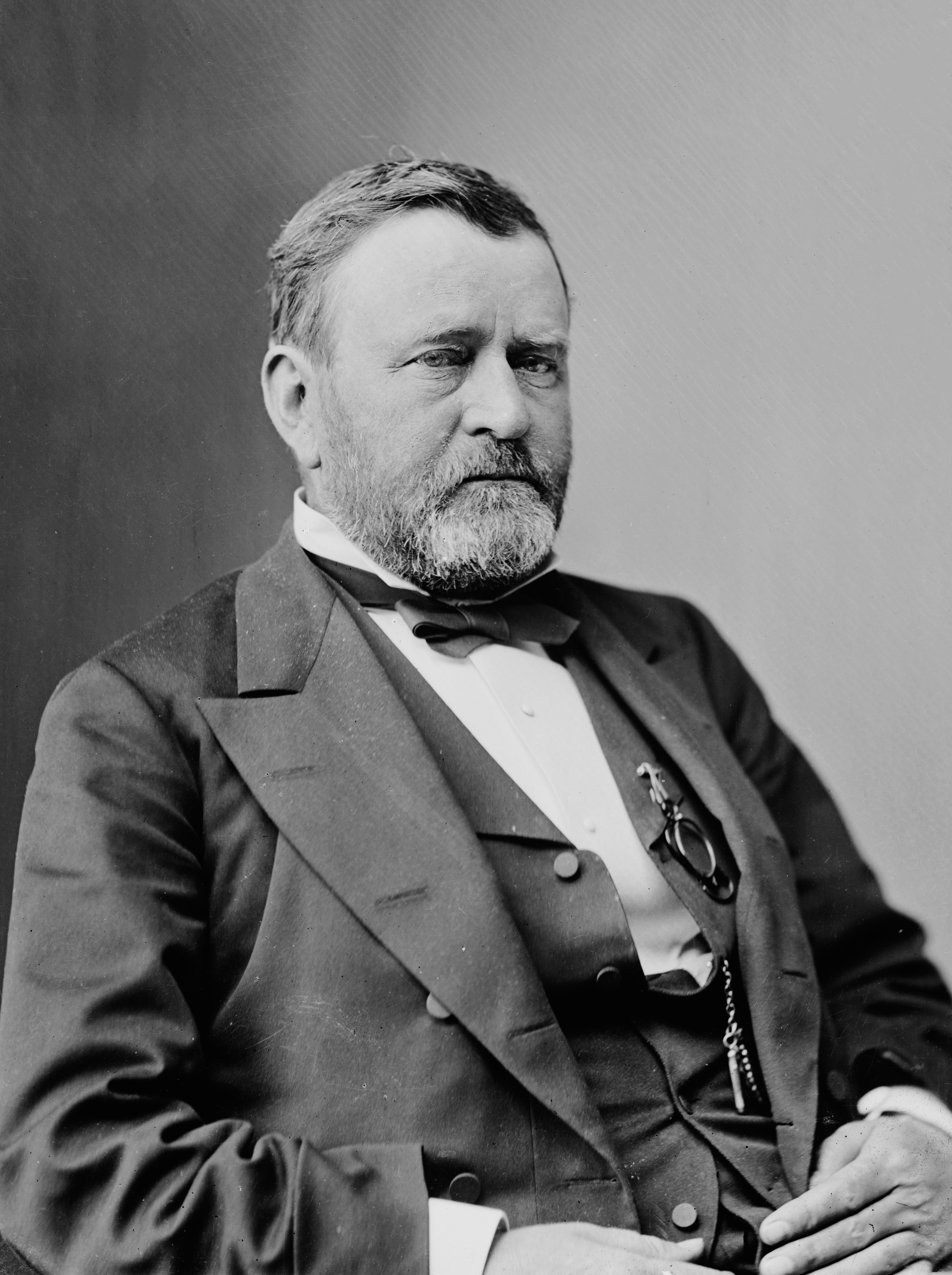
President Ulysses S. Grant

Grant's acceptance of Belknap's resignation on March 2, 1876, caused considerable commotion in the U.S. House of Representatives since the House was ready to vote on Belknap's impeachment on the same day. Grant had Attorney General Pierrepont launch an investigation into Belknap; however, no charges were made by the Justice Department against Belknap.

Protective of his family, Grant was furious that Custer testified against the President's brother Orvil at the Clymer committee hearings. Sherman advised Custer to see Grant at the White House to talk over the situation; however, Grant refused on several occasions to see Custer. Grant's refusal to see Custer was designed to humiliate the Colonel. When Custer left to return to Fort Lincoln, Grant had Custer arrested in Chicago, since Custer left Washington without visiting Grant or Sherman, a breach of military protocol. By Custer's own request, he was moved to Fort Lincoln under arrest to serve out his detention from active service. Grant relieved Custer from command of the expedition against the Lakota Sioux, eventually given to Alfred H. Terry by Sheridan, and forbade him from going on the expedition. The Eastern press was outraged by Grant's actions against Custer and stated Grant had punished Custer for his testimony at the Clymer Committee. After Custer wrote Grant a letter, from one soldier to another, to allow him to participate in the Sioux Expedition, Grant relented. Custer had also gotten the reluctant endorsement of Sheridan, who knew that Custer was a skilled military leader. Grant allowed Custer to join the expedition on the grounds that he would not take with him any pressmen. Custer bragged he would "swing clear" of Terry's command once on the Expedition.

== Senate trial and acquittal ==
On March 3, 1876, a committee of five from the House of Representatives, headed by Clymer, presented Belknap's articles of impeachment to the Senate. After much debate, on May 29, the Senate finally voted 37 to 29 that Belknap, as a private citizen, could not be barred from trial and impeachment. Belknap's lengthy Senate trial, which took place in July, was very popular and the Senate gallery was filled with onlookers. Belknap was finally acquitted by the Senate on August 1, 1876. With 40 votes needed for conviction, 25 senators voted no on each of five counts, while the yes votes were 35, 36, 36, 36, and 37, thus acquitting Belknap by failing to reach the required two-thirds majority. Many of the Senators voting against conviction expressed the belief that a private citizen could not be impeached by the House or put on trial by the Senate. Grant's timely acceptance of Belknap's resignation had unquestionably saved Belknap from conviction.

== Aftermath ==
After Belknap was acquitted by the Senate, he was indicted in Washington, D.C., District Courts. However, his case was not actively pursued, since actions under $40,000 rarely won prosecution. Belknap, stigmatized by the House Impeachment and Senate trial, remained in Washington, D.C., and made his living as an attorney. Grant replaced Belknap with the judicious and popularly received Alphonso Taft as Secretary of War.

== Bibliography ==
=== Books ===
- Donovan, James (2008). A Terrible Glory: Custer and the Little Bighorn. New York, New York: Little, Brown, and Company. ISBN 978-0-316-15578-6.
- McFeely, William S. (1981). Grant: A Biography. New York, New York: W.W. Norton & Company, LTD. ISBN 0-393-01372-3.
- Oberholtzer, Ellis Paxson (1926). A History of the United States since the Civil War. Vol. 3. pp. 159–70.
- Smith, Jean Edward (2001). Grant. New York, New York: Simon & Schuster. ISBN 0-684-84927-5.

=== Articles ===
- Koster, John (June 2010). "The Belknap Scandal Fulcrum to Disaster". Wild West: 58–64.

=== Newspapers ===
- "The Proceedings in the Senate". The New York Times. March 4, 1876.
- "Gen. Belknap's Impeachment". The New York Times. May 30, 1876.
- "Acquittal of Belknap". The New York Times. August 2, 1876.

=== Primary ===
- "Trial of William W. Belknap". Proceedings of the Senate. Washington Government Printing Office. 1876.
