= William W. Belknap =

30th U.S. Secretary of War (1829–1890)

William Belknap
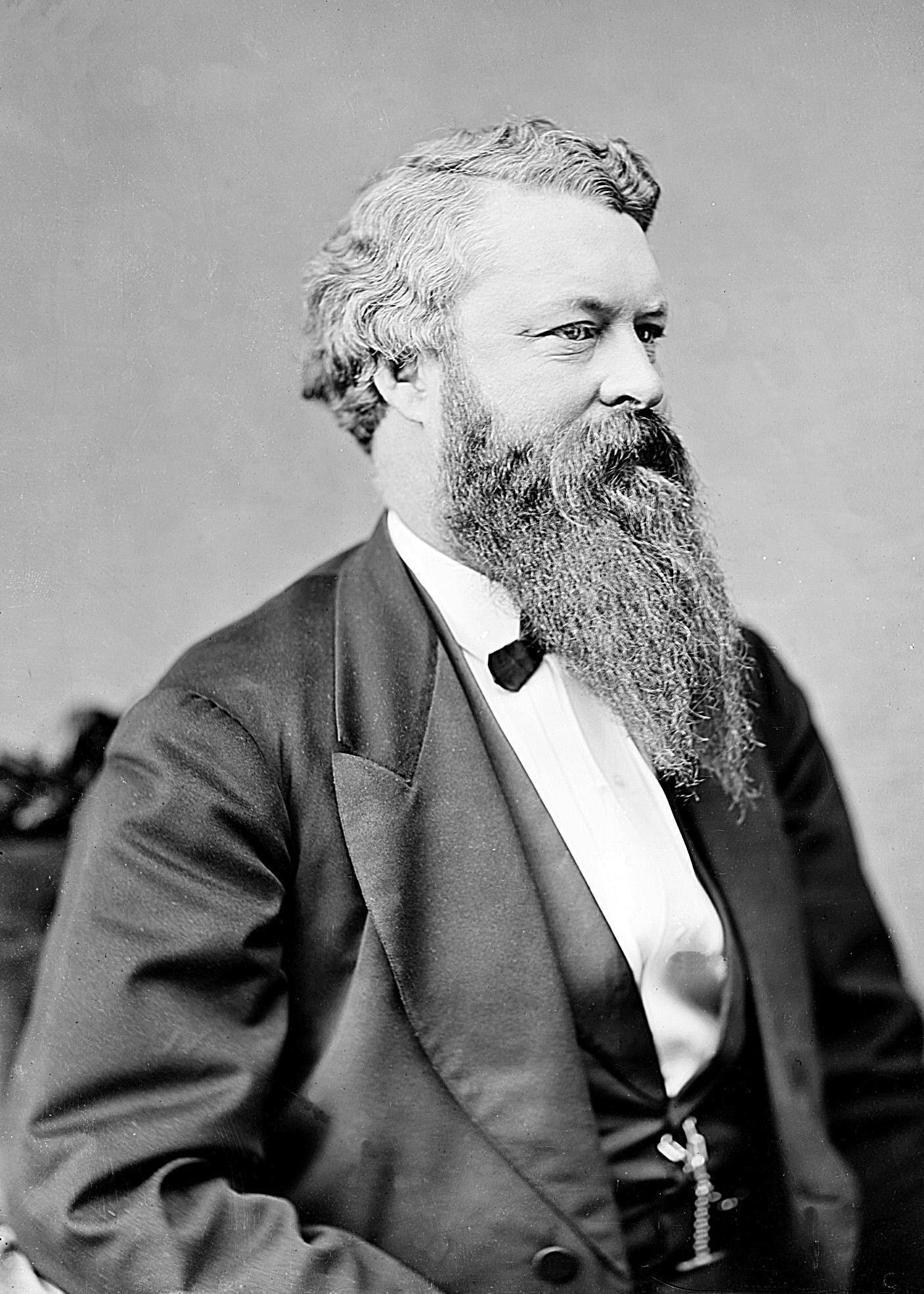
- Belknap c. 1860–75

30th United States Secretary of War
- In office October 25, 1869 – March 2, 1876
- President: Ulysses S. Grant
- Preceded by: William Tecumseh Sherman (acting)
- Succeeded by: Alphonso Taft

Member of the Iowa House of Representatives from the 54th district
- In office January 11, 1858 – January 8, 1860 Serving with Cyrenus Bauder; John Casey
- Preceded by: Constituency established
- Succeeded by: George Ruddick

Personal details
- Born: William Worth Belknap; September 22, 1829 Newburgh, New York, U.S.
- Died: October 12, 1890 (aged 61) Washington, D.C., U.S.
- Party: Democratic (before 1865); Republican (1865–1890)
- Spouses: Cora LeRoy (m. 1854; died 1862); Carrie Tomlinson (m. 1869; died 1870); Amanda Tomlinson Bower (m. 1873)
- Education: Princeton University (BA); Georgetown University

Military service
- Allegiance: United States
- Branch/service: United States Army • Union Army
- Years of service: 1861 (Iowa Home Guard); 1861–1865 (Army)
- Rank: Captain (Iowa Home Guard); Brigadier General (USV); Brevet Major General (USV)
- Unit: Keokuk City Rifles; 15th Iowa Infantry Regiment; XVII Corps
- Commands: Keokuk City Rifles (1861); 15th Iowa Infantry (1861–1864); 4th Regiment, XVII Corps (1864–1865)
- Battles/wars: American Civil War; Battle of Athens; Battle of Shiloh; First Battle of Corinth; Siege of Vicksburg; Battle of Atlanta; Battle of Ezra Church; Atlanta campaign; Sherman's March to the Sea

William Worth Belknap (September 22, 1829 – October 12, 1890) was an American lawyer, Union Army officer, government administrator in Iowa, and the 30th United States secretary of war, serving under President Ulysses S. Grant. Belknap was impeached on March 2, 1876, for his role in the trader post scandal but was acquitted by the Senate. Belknap was the first cabinet secretary in U.S. history to be impeached.

A native of New York, Belknap graduated from the College of New Jersey, now Princeton University, in 1848, studied law with a Georgetown attorney, and passed the bar in 1851. He moved to Iowa, where he practiced law in partnership with Ralph P. Lowe. Belknap entered politics as a Democrat and served one term in the Iowa House of Representatives. When the American Civil War broke out in 1861, Belknap joined the Union Army. A tall burly man, Belknap was a natural Union Army leader and recruiter. A veteran of the Iowa Home Guard who had attained the rank of captain, he was commissioned as a major in the 15th Iowa Volunteer Infantry. He took part in numerous engagements, including Shiloh, where he was wounded, and Corinth. He served as a regimental, brigade, division, and corps commander, and served in high-level staff positions. By the end of the war, Belknap had been promoted to brigadier general and received a brevet promotion to major general of volunteers.

After declining a regular Army commission, Belknap was appointed Iowa's Collector of Internal Revenue by President Andrew Johnson; he served with distinction for four years. In 1869, President Ulysses S. Grant appointed Belknap as Secretary of War. During his tenure, Belknap ordered portraits of all the previous secretaries, intending to create a complete collection in honor of the United States Centennial. In 1871, Belknap was investigated by Congress, after he was directly involved in the sale of arms and munitions to France, while the United States was ostensibly neutral during the Franco-Prussian War. The same year, Belknap had arranged aid for victims of the catastrophic Chicago Fire.

During the Reconstruction era, Belknap's War Department and the U.S. military worked under the supervision of President Ulysses S. Grant and the United States Attorney General's office to occupy the former Confederacy and attempt to implement changes in government and the economy, while protecting freedmen from an increasingly violent insurgency. Belknap supported Grant's Reconstruction policy, which most Democrats opposed.

In 1875, Grant, Belknap, and other members of Grant's administration secretly agreed to remove troops from the Black Hills after gold was discovered. The US had protected the area from white settlers as part of a US treaty with the Lakota. The withdrawal of troops allowed a gold rush of white settlers to take place, and the US took de facto possession after the Lakota refused to sell their sacred lands. In 1876, the trader post scandal at Fort Sill led to Belknap's sudden resignation, impeachment by the Democratic-controlled House, and trial by the Senate. While a majority of senators voted to convict, they lacked the two-thirds required, and Belknap was acquitted. Judge Arthur MacArthur Sr. dismissed Belknap's Washington D. C. federal trial. Belknap resumed practicing law in Washington; he continued to be popular among Iowa Civil War veterans and was active until he died of a heart attack in 1890. One historian described Belknap as a man of both virtues and flaws, a talented lawyer, administrator, and military officer, but whose personal corruption overshadowed his positive qualities.

== Early life and career ==
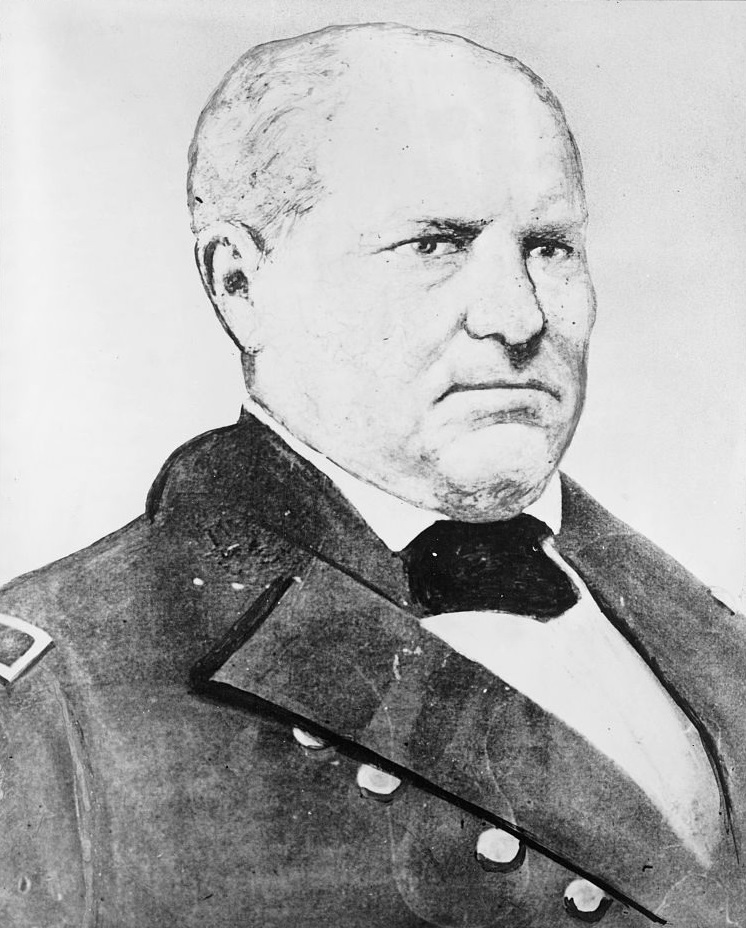
William G. Belknap Father

William Worth Belknap was born in Newburgh, New York on September 22, 1829, the son of career soldier William G. Belknap and Anne Clark Belknap. Belknap's father fought with distinction in the War of 1812, the Florida War, and Mexican–American War. Belknap attended the local schools in Newburgh, and graduated from the College of New Jersey at Princeton in 1848. In addition to attending Princeton with Hiester Clymer, the Democratic Congressman who later led the investigation into Belknap's War Department corruption, Belknap was a college contemporary of Grant's Secretary of Navy George M. Robeson, who was one year behind Clymer and Belknap at Princeton. After graduation, he studied law with Georgetown attorney Hugh E. Caperton. After passing an examination by Judge William Cranch in 1851, Belknap was admitted to the Washington, D.C. bar, and began looking for a place to settle and begin his career.

He moved west to Keokuk, Iowa, and entered into a partnership with Ralph P. Lowe. Deciding to make Iowa his permanent residence, in 1854, Belknap had a home built in Keokuk. He joined the Democratic Party and successfully ran for state office in 1856, serving in the Iowa House of Representatives from the 54th district between 1858 and 1860. Belknap was looked on as a rising Iowa Democratic leader. Belknap also joined a local company of the Iowa Home Guard, the Keokuk City Rifles, and he attained the rank of captain.

== Marriages and family ==
In 1854 Belknap married Cora LeRoy, who died in 1862. They had one child together, Hugh R. Belknap, who served as a U.S. representative from Illinois. Belknap married Carita S. Tomlinson of Kentucky in January 1869; she died of tuberculosis shortly after childbirth in December 1870.

Belknap married again on December 11, 1873, to Amanda (née Tomlinson) Bower, his second wife's widowed sister. They had a daughter, Alice Belknap, born November 28, 1874. Alice Belknap was considered one of Washington society's most sought-after belles. In 1897 she reportedly converted to Judaism for her engagement to Paul May, an attaché of the Belgian legation in Washington. The engagement was broken the following year, and in June 1898 Alice Belknap married William Barklie Henry of Philadelphia.

== American Civil War ==
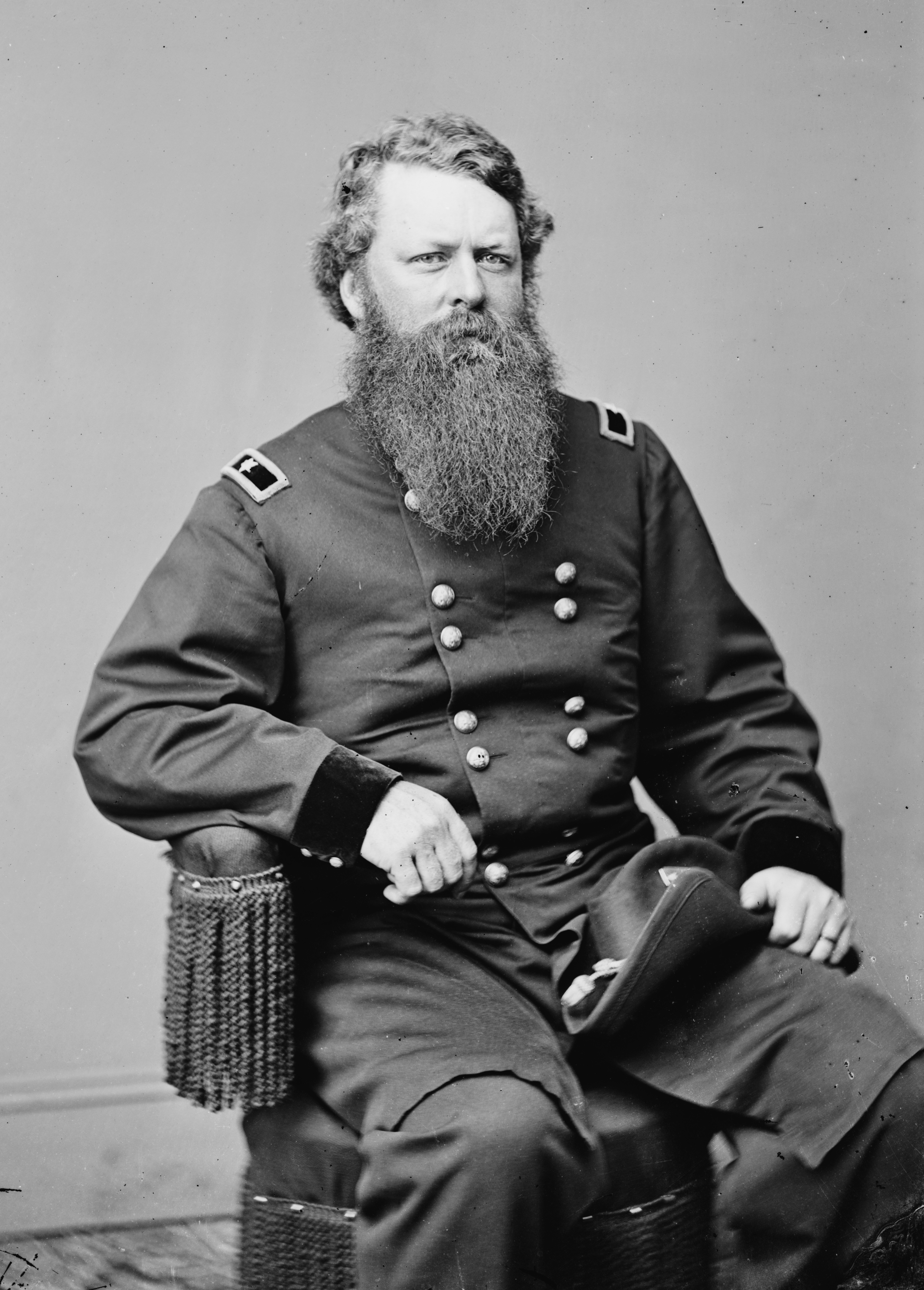
Major General Belknap

When the American Civil War started, Belknap remained loyal to the Union as a pro-war Democrat. He first saw action in the Battle of Athens as the captain of the Keokuk City Rifles, a company of the Iowa Home Guard. He enlisted in the Union Army as a volunteer on November 7, 1861, and commissioned as a major. On December 7 he was mustered in and tasked with raising and equipping the 15th Iowa Volunteer Infantry. Belknap was assigned to Companies F&S. A rugged, charismatic and handsome man, Belknap was well-suited to the rigors of being a soldier. At over six feet tall and 200 pounds, with blue eyes, and fair hair, mustache, and beard, Belknap was regarded a natural leader described as "a fine type of Saxon-American manhood". In addition, the public speaking skills and powers of persuasion he developed as a lawyer made him an effective recruiter. Belknap was a natural soldier, whose leadership skills, loud voice, and militia experience were assets in the training of newly enlisted privates.

=== Shiloh, Corinth, and Vicksburg ===
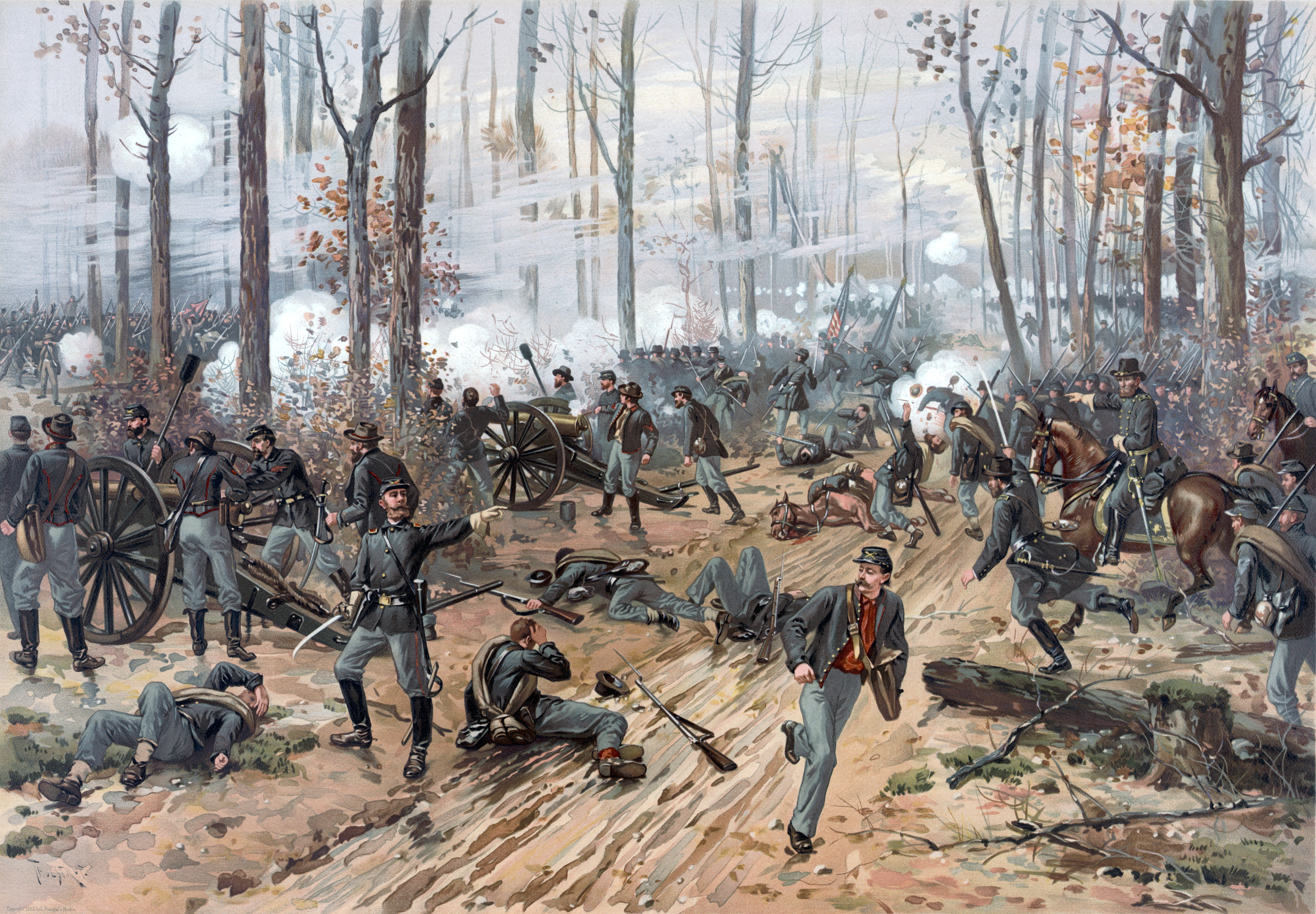
Battle of Shiloh

In March 1862, Maj. Belknap and the 15th Iowa Volunteer Infantry were mustered into military action. Traveling by steamer from St. Louis, Belknap was sent to the front at the Battle of Shiloh; arriving at Pittsburgh Landing on April 6 joining the Army of the Tennessee, under the authority of Union General Ulysses S. Grant. Belknap and his men were ordered to the front to serve under Maj. Gen Benjamin M. Prentiss at the Hornet's Nest. Belknap and his raw 15th Iowa Volunteer Infantry troops were forced to fight like regular army veterans on Prentiss's depleted line. Belknap was slightly wounded in the shoulder, and his horse was shot and killed from under him. Afterwards he continued on the field on foot. Reinforced, the Union Army under General Grant, forced the Confederates to retreat back to Corinth, and Shiloh was considered a Union victory.

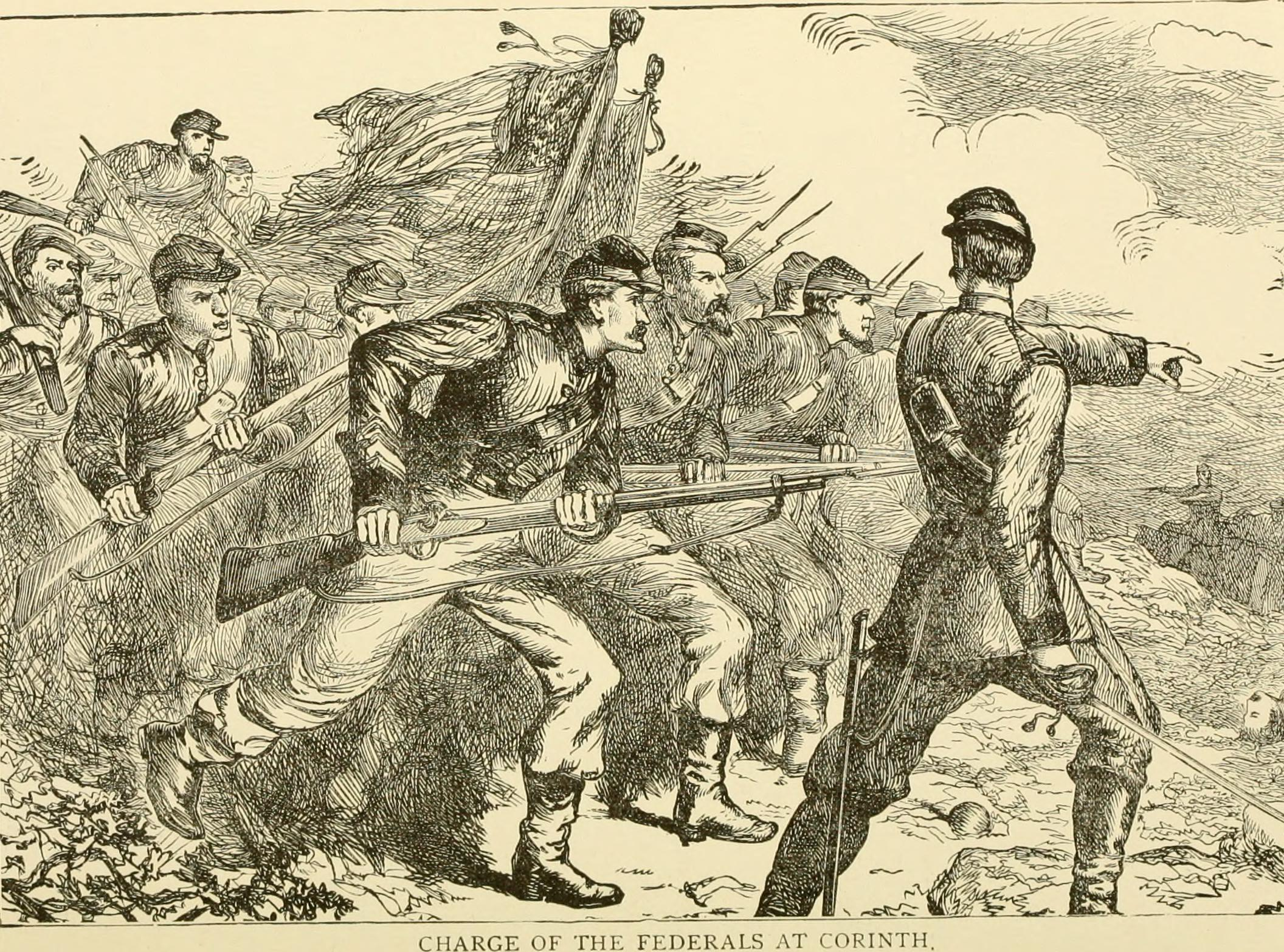
Charge of the Federals Battle of Corinth (1862)

After Shiloh, Belknap served as acting commander of the 15th Iowa Volunteer Infantry at the Battle of Corinth. Col. Hugh T. Reid, commander of the 15th Iowa Volunteer Infantry, had been severely injured in the neck at Shiloh and removed from active duty. Col. Reid stated that at Shiloh Belknap, "was always in the right place at the right time, directing and encouraging officers and men as coolly as a veteran" At Corinth, Belknap was noted for his "conspicuous gallantry". After Corinth, Belknap and the 15th Iowa Volunteer Infantry for a time served on guard duty. Belknap was formally promoted from major to lieutenant colonel on August 20, 1862. Belknap was promoted from lieutenant colonel to colonel of the Iowa 15th Volunteer Infantry on June 3, 1863.

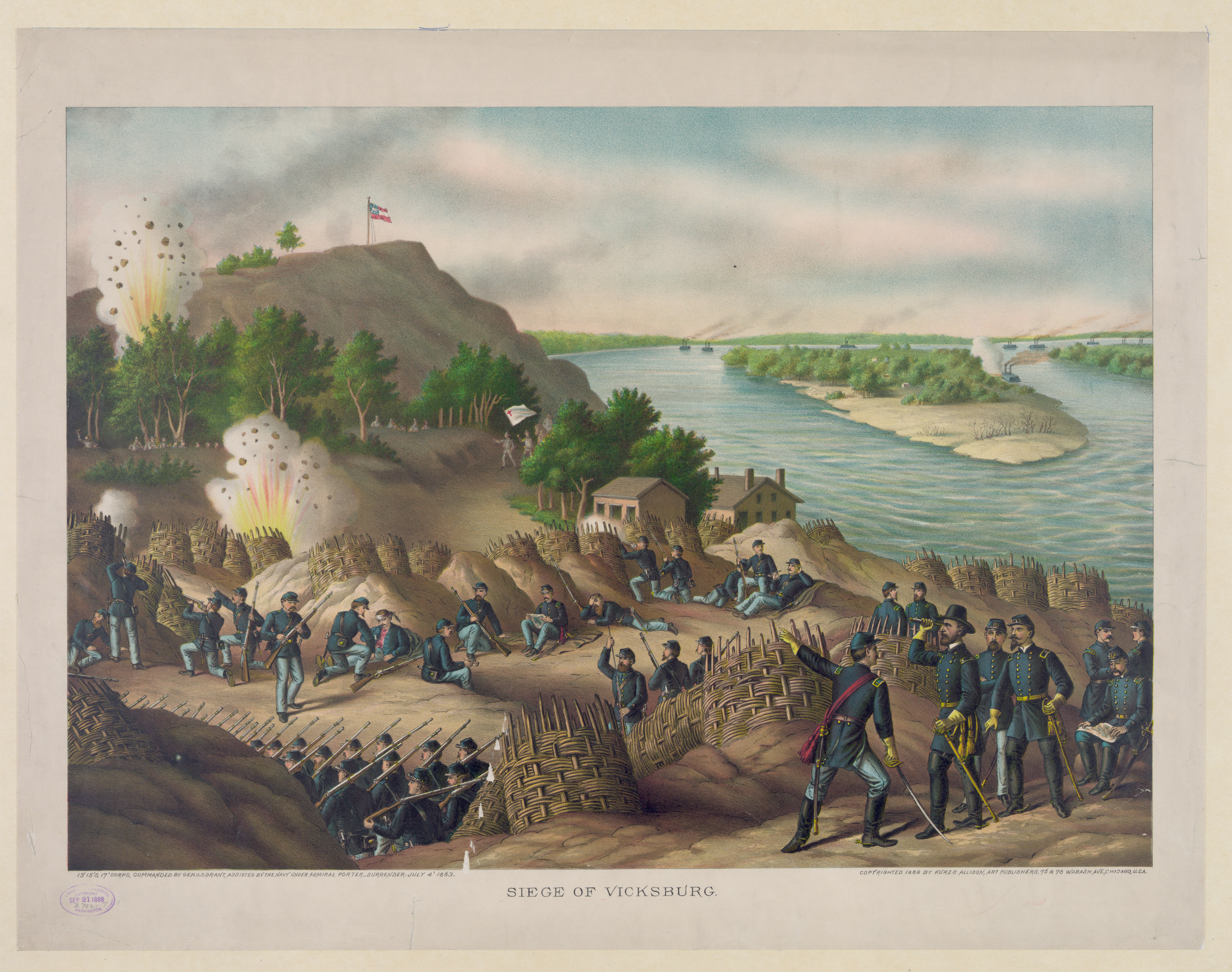
Siege of Vicksburg

The Union capture of Vicksburg, the last Confederate stronghold on the Mississippi, was vital and would split the Confederacy in two. Belknap's primary military operation took place at the Siege of Vicksburg until Confederate General John C. Pemberton surrendered to Union General Grant on July 4, 1863. Colonel Belknap, Fifteenth Iowa, was part of the Third Brigade of the Sixth Division serving under Major General John McArthur.

On December 24, 1863, Belknap was in command of the 11th Iowa Volunteer Infantry and the 15th Iowa Volunteer Infantry reinforcing Redbone, Mississippi, south of Vicksburg. On February 26, 1864, Belknap served as provost marshal of post in Canton, Mississippi.

=== Battle of Atlanta, Battle of Ezra Church, and March to the Sea ===
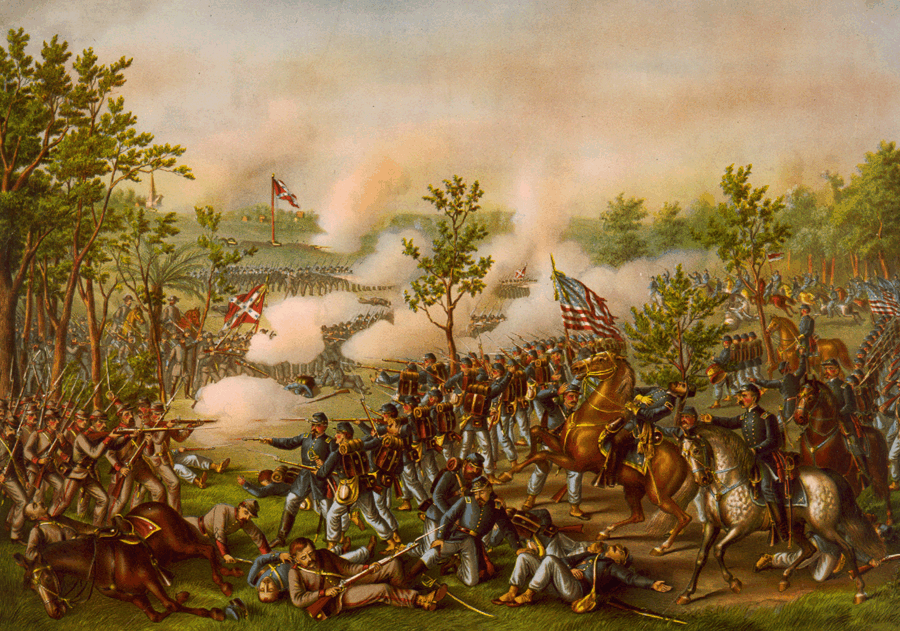
Battle of Atlanta

On June 8, 1864, Col. Belknap and the veteran 15th Iowa Volunteer Infantry were transferred to the 4th Division, XVII Corps at Ackworth, Georgia. On July 22, 1864, at the Battle of Atlanta, Belknap served with distinction, fighting against the 45th Alabama Infantry. Belknap and his Iowa troops dug in and set up earthworks and a parapet around Bald Hill. The 45th Alabama infantry led by Confederate Col. Harris D. Lampley, assaulted the entrenched Union line two times but were repelled by massive Union gun power. On the second attempt, Lampley and his remaining men crossed over to the Union line for hand-to-hand combat. Lampley, who had been shot, cursed his men who had fallen or were retreating. In the midst of the fierce fighting the burly Belknap grabbed the wounded Lampley by the collar, spun him around to face the Confederate lines, and shouted, "Look at your men! They are dead! What are you cursing them for!?" Belknap took the wounded Lampley prisoner; he was held until his death on August 24.

William H. Chamberlain of the 81st Ohio Infantry Regiment later wrote: "The next day [July 23, 1864] I remember seeing Colonel Wm. W. Belknap of the 15th Iowa (afterward Brigadier-General and Secretary of War). He was a brawny, red-bearded giant in appearance, and it was told of him that he had captured a number of prisoners by pulling them over the breastworks by main force, so closely were the lines engaged."

On July 28, 1864, at the Battle of Ezra Church, Belknap was in charge of the 15th Iowa Volunteer Infantry and the 32nd Ohio Volunteer Infantry, which reinforced Maj. Gen. Morgan Lewis Smith's XV Corps. On July 30, Belknap was promoted to brigadier general as commander of the 4th Division, XVII Corps, and participated in Major Gen. Sherman's operations in Georgia and the Carolinas. After Atlanta was taken by the Union Army, Belknap accompanied Maj. Gen. Sherman on his March to the Sea. Belknap was promoted to Brevet Major General of Volunteers on March 13, 1865, as a reward for his bravery in the Atlanta Campaign. Having declined a regular Army commission, on August 24, 1865, Belknap was mustered out of the U.S. Army.

== Iowa Collector of Internal Revenue (1865–1869) ==
In 1865, President Andrew Johnson appointed Belknap Collector of Internal Revenue for Iowa's 1st District. In this position, Belknap was responsible for collecting millions of dollars in federal taxes; collectors were paid a percentage of the revenue they brought in, which made the position lucrative and highly sought after. Belknap served for four years until he was appointed Secretary of War by President Ulysses S. Grant in 1869. During his term as Collector, which coincided with the Reconstruction Era, Belknap associated himself with the Republican Party. Belknap served with distinction; when his Collector's accounts were settled, they were accurate to within four cents.

== Secretary of War (1869–1876) ==
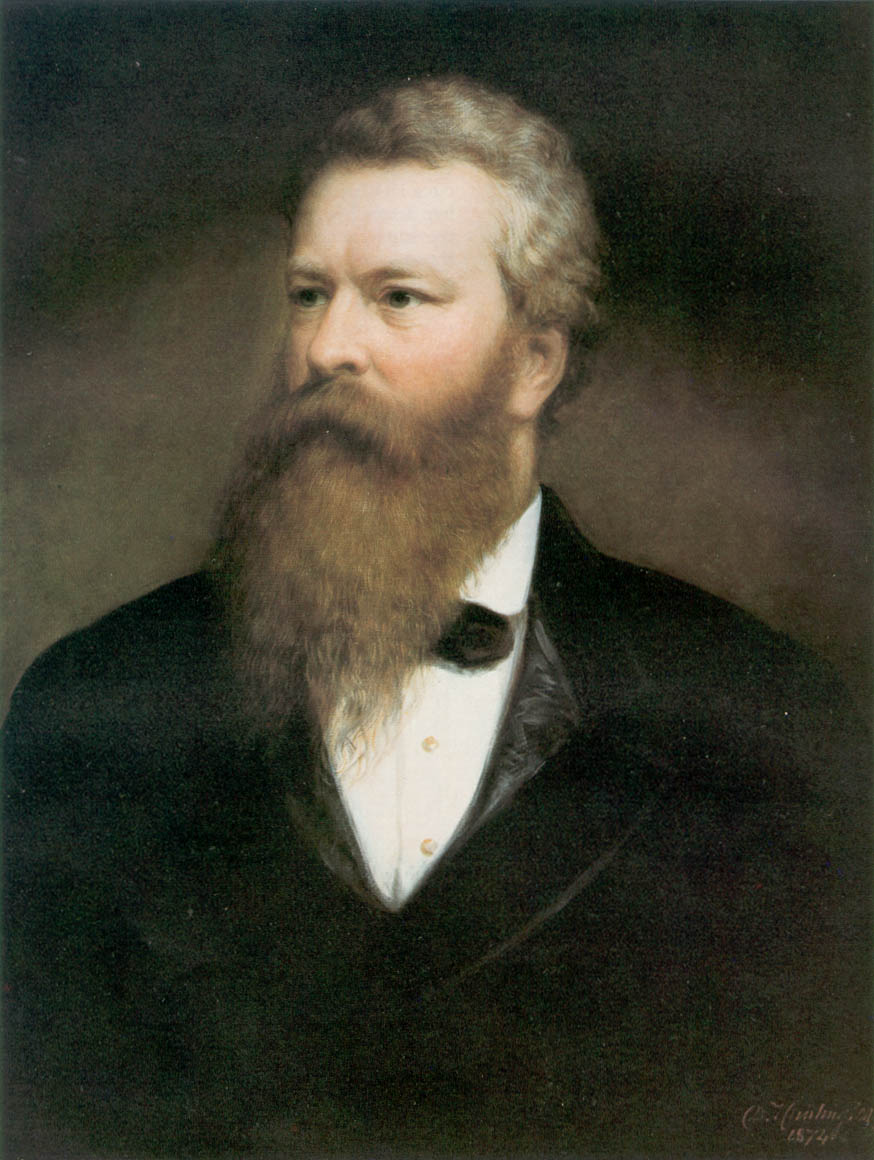
William W. Belknap 30th U.S. Secretary of War Huntington 1874

On the advice of General of the Army William T. Sherman, President Ulysses S. Grant appointed Belknap to Secretary of War on October 25, 1869, to take the place of Secretary John A. Rawlins, who had died in office of tuberculosis. Sherman himself had served briefly as acting secretary of war, after Rawlins's death. Belknap was seen as a protégé of Sherman's, having fought in the Atlanta Campaign and accompanied him on Sherman's March to the Sea. President Grant believed Belknap had served capably during the American Civil War and deserved to head the War Department.

After his appointment, Belknap implemented or recommended several positive initiatives. He recommended that Congress act to fix the date of May 1 as the start of the fiscal year, allowing for more accurate accounting of department funds. He inaugurated the preparation of historical reports by post commanders as a way to document their activities for posterity, and proposed actions to preserve Yellowstone National Park. Not all of Belknap's actions were well received, however. He bypassed Sherman when making appointments, and reduced Sherman's budget, thus weakening the authority of the General of the Army position.

In 1874, Sherman responded by leaving Washington and moving his headquarters to St. Louis. Major General Oliver O. Howard was also ostracized by Belknap. While stationed in Oregon, in 1874, Major General Howard candidly expressed his opinion of Belknap. Howard stated that Belknap was deceptive to "General Grant", that Belknap was not a true Republican, and that he associated nightly with "foul-mouthed" Democratic Kentucky associates. Howard also opined that Belknap was "not in favor" of the President's Indian Peace policy. That statement is likely related to a conflict, during Belknap's tenure, between the War and Interior Departments as to which would exercise control over American Indian policy. In the context of this era, Belknap's actions may not be seen as overly aggressive or overreaching. In terms of Reconstruction, historian Jean Edward Smith, notes that Grant, a former General of the Army, personally supervised the use of the U.S. military and that Belknap "had less freedom of action than other cabinet members." Belknap held office for 6 years, 4 months, and 7 days.

=== War Department portrait gallery (1869) ===
Upon assuming office in 1869, Belknap conceived the idea of creating portraits of previous civilian heads of the War Department in honor of the upcoming 1876 U.S. Centennial, and hired renowned artists Daniel Huntington, Robert Weir, and Henry Ulke. Belknap's portrait was painted by Huntington in 1874. The portraits were assembled into a distinct collection to be viewed by the public. The portrait initiative was continued by Belknap's successors; in addition to secretaries, the collection came to include others notable for their military distinction. This effort at historic preservation was considered a success, and Belknap received "unqualified credit" for his creation of the War Department portrait gallery.

=== Indian ring (1870–1876) ===
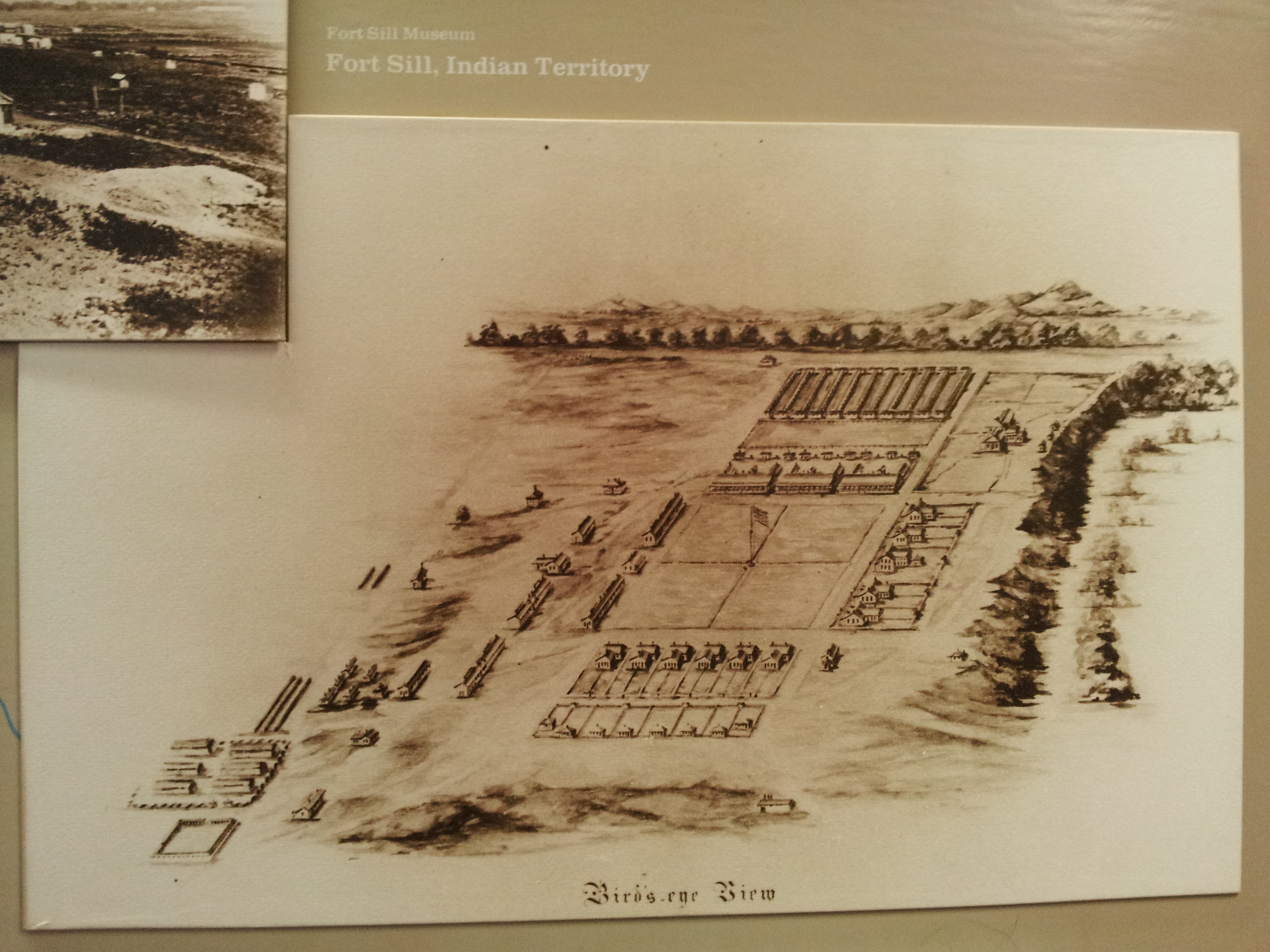
Fort Sill Oklahoma Indian Territory

During the summer of 1870, Belknap successfully lobbied Congress to grant him the sole power to appoint and license agents, known as sutlers, with ownership rights to highly lucrative "traderships" at U.S. military forts in the Western frontier. These monopoly traderships were considered good investments during the Gilded Age and were highly sought after. On July 15, the Commanding General of the Army's power to appoint traderships was repealed, empowering Belknap while further eroding Sherman's authority.

To ensure maximum profits, Belknap ordered soldiers stationed at forts having Belknap-approved sutlers to buy supplies only through the authorized traderships. Soldiers on the Western frontier, who were thus forced to buy goods at exorbitant prices that far exceeded the usual rate, were left in debt or destitute thus. One 7th Cavalry Sergeant noted that a shot of whiskey "mostly glass" cost 25 cents (.25¢ 1871 = $5.40 2019) glass, at a time when soldiers were paid a few dollars ($1.00 1871 = $21.60 2019) a month.

Hostile American Indians bought supplies at these traderships, including high-quality single-shot breech-loaders and repeating rifles. At the same time, Army requisitions for rifles were filled by Belknap's War Department with inferior single-shot breech-loaders that jammed frequently, and were no match for superior breech-loaders and repeating rifles. The policy had a negative effect on the firepower of the U.S. troops and may have contributed to the defeat of George Armstrong Custer and the 7th Cavalry at Battle of the Little Big Horn in June 1876, several months after Belknap was out of office. (However, Custer had also decided against bringing Gatling guns; these would have increased Custer's firepower, even if his troops had been armed with inferior rifles.)

Belknap's second wife, Carita, was socially ambitious and unwilling to live in Washington, D.C., on Belknap's $8,000 annual salary (about $157,000 in 2018). When the couple arrived in Washington from Keokuk, Iowa in 1869, Belknap rented a large house recently vacated by Secretary of State William H. Seward. In hosting large parties, a typical social requirement for cabinet members, the Belknaps overextended their invitations; one of their events had 1,200 guests, including many young army officers; the resulting raucous behavior led to extensive damage and vandalism, including destruction of curtains, couches, and other furniture. The Belknaps could not afford to pay for the damages, and were faced with leaving Washington society and reducing expenses by living in a boarding house, or finding a way to increase their income.

They decided to look for additional income, and Carita engineered a plan to obtain a lucrative "cash cow" Indian tradership position at the recently built Fort Sill, located in the Oklahoma Indian Territory. Carita lobbied her husband to appoint a New York contractor, Caleb P. Marsh, to the Fort Sill tradership; John S. Evans, an experienced sutler, had already been appointed and did not want to give it up. To settle the question, Marsh drew up an illicit partnership contract that allowed Evans to keep the tradership at Fort Sill if he paid Marsh $12,000 per year in quarterly installments (approximately $236,000 in 2018). Marsh, in turn, was required to give half of his $12,000 to Carita, also in quarterly installments. All the parties agreed to the arrangement; however, Carita received only one payment before her death from tuberculosis after childbirth in December 1870.

After Carita's death, Marsh continued to pay the quarterly share of the profits to Carita's younger sister Amanda, known as "Puss", who had moved in with the Belknaps, ostensibly to hold as a trust fund for the benefit of Carita's child. This profiteering arrangement between Amanda and Marsh was all done with Belknap's full knowledge and consent. After Carita's child died in June 1871, Amanda left to tour Europe, and Belknap continued to take the quarterly bribery payments until December 1873, when Amanda returned and became Belknap's third wife. Amanda was a beautiful young socialite; intending to keep the modest fortune she inherited from her family while also attaining a high position in Washington society, she required Belknap to sign a prenuptial agreement.

Belknap rented a large new house on G Street, which had been built by Orville Babcock, President Grant's personal secretary. From that time onward, Belknap and Amanda continued to accept Marsh's quarterly payments. Amanda was considered to be more self-indulgent than her sister Carita, donning gorgeous gowns, jewelry and other accessories for parties and other events, and called the "spendthrift belle" by Washington society. The Belknaps' extravagant lifestyle entertaining Washington society, holding lavish parties, and wearing elegant clothes, created envy among both Democratic political figures and permanent residents of Washington. However, that the Belknaps were receiving kickbacks was not publicly known until February 1876, when the Democratic-controlled House of Representatives launched an investigation, which discovered that Belknap and his wives had received about $20,000 (approximately $394,000 in 2018) in bribes from Marsh.

=== French arms sales (1870) ===
During the Franco-Prussian War from 1870 to 1871, the United States declared neutrality. Belknap had been accused by Grant administration critics, including Senators Charles Sumner and Carl Schurz, of violating neutrality and selling arms to French agents. In fact, Belknap had sold obsolete U.S. War Department firearms to a neighbor of the Remington family, which owned the E. Remington and Sons firearms and ammunition company. Samuel Remington, as an arms-selling agent to the French Government, then arranged the sale of those firearms to France. Belknap subsequently sold 54,000,000 cartridges to the French Army – cartridges that would specifically fit the firearms he had previously sold to the Remington neighbor. A Congressional investigation that took place in 1872 exonerated Belknap.

=== Pardoned Cadet Smith (1871) ===
During the Reconstruction Era, former slave James Webster Smith became the first African American cadet to enroll at West Point. After starting classes in 1870, Smith was immediately and severely hazed by white cadets. One of Belknap's nephews, a cadet at the academy, had been reprimanded (but not otherwise punished) for hazing Smith. In another instance, Smith was arrested and taken to a military court for fighting a white cadet, though Smith said he had merely defended himself. Major General Oliver O. Howard, an advocate for African-American civil rights and in charge of the trial, acquitted Smith and gave him a light punishment for unruly conduct. This outraged the academy's Bureau of Military Justice, who made a formal protest to Belknap on November 20, 1870. In another hazing incident, in January 1871, Smith was arrested for supposedly not holding his head up when marching, again after being severely harassed by white cadets.

With Howard now reassigned to the western United States, the academy's administration determined to force Smith out. This time he was convicted; his case was then appealed to Belknap. Smith had been recommended for expulsion, but Belknap intervened with President Grant, who changed the sentence to setting Smith back academically, which caused him to repeat his Plebe year. Smith continued at West Point until 1874, when Professor Peter S. Michie, a white supremacist, gave Smith a private test, in defiance of traditional West Point practice, and claimed that Smith had failed. Smith was then denied a chance to retest and was forced out of West Point.

Belknap concurred when Major General Thomas H. Ruger, appointed superintendent of West Point in 1871, reduced the hazing of cadets by 1873 and made strong efforts to eradicate the "discreditable" practice. Belknap admired Ruger's performance as West Point Superintendent and stated, "I am pretty satisfied with the success of your management, and private conversations with officers of all grades, & with civilians too, who have been there since your accession..." Other African Americans followed Smith's entrance into West Point and Henry O. Flipper became the first to graduate from the academy in 1877. In 1997, President Bill Clinton attempted to acknowledge and right the wrong done to Smith by awarding him a posthumous commission as a second lieutenant.

=== Aiding Chicago fire victims (1871) ===
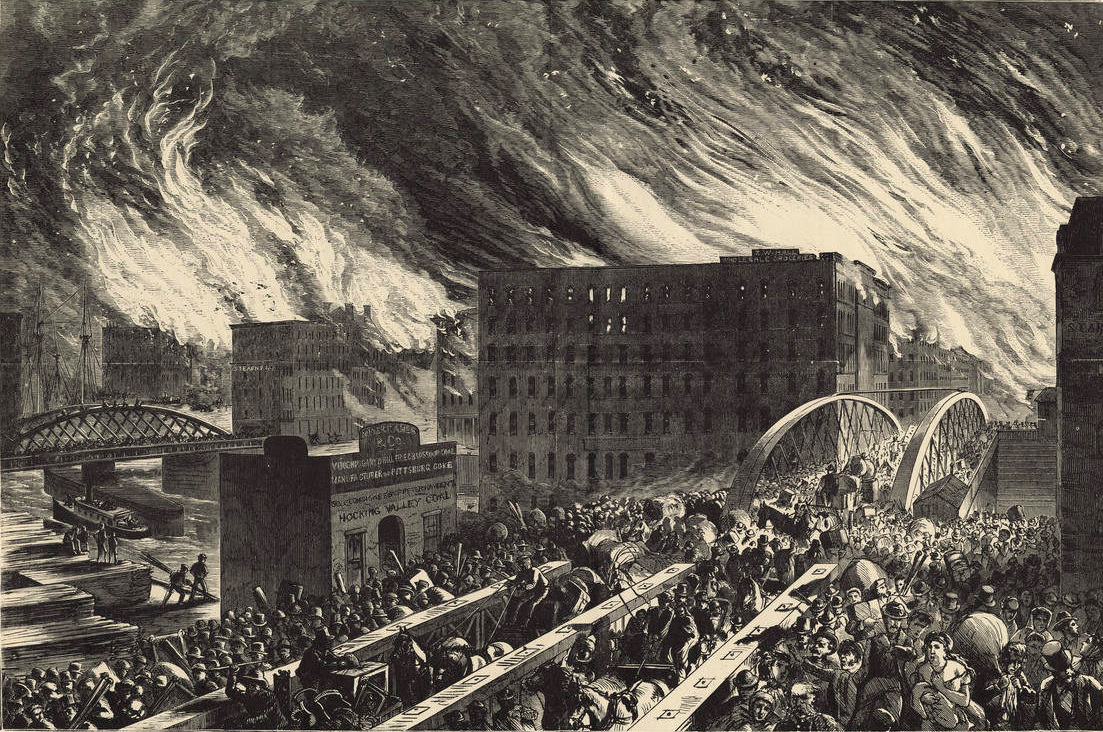
Belknap aided victims of the devastating 1871 Chicago fire.

From October 8 to October 10, 1871, a devastating fire burned and destroyed much of Chicago, killing hundreds of people and causing $200,000,000 (nearly $4 billion in 2018) in damages. Over 100,000 citizens were left destitute and homeless. Belknap took prompt action on October 9, ordering food sent from St. Louis, tents from Jefferson Barracks, and two companies of troops from Fort Omaha to help keep peace and order. On October 10, Belknap in writing a dispatch to Lt. General Philip Sheridan stated that the fire was "...a national calamity. The sufferers have the sincere sympathy of the nation." Belknap ordered military officers around the nation to send supplies to Chicago "liberally and promptly".

In his Annual Report to President Grant in December 1871, Belknap praised the War Department for the efficiency of operations in aiding the homeless and destitute of the Chicago Fire within hours of notification, while the fire was still in progress. Belknap also praised Sheridan and the several companies of troops under his command for keeping law and order in the ruined city.

=== Requested prisoner and prison reform (1871) ===
In the summer of 1871, a U.S. Board of military officers visited the Quebec, Canada military prison run by the British Army. The board recommended that British methods be adopted in the U.S. Army, including a system of rewards for good behavior, and difficult physical exercise and taxing military drill and ceremony as punishments, with the goals of returning prisoners to military duty at the end of their sentences and preventing re-offenses. Belknap approved the board's recommendations and requested Congress incorporate the British system into the U.S. military, and also requested that funding for the new program be paid for by having soldiers forfeit their pay during the time of their incarceration.

=== New Orleans 1872 street riot ===
During Reconstruction Grant enforced civil and voting rights for African Americans in the South, using the army and newly created Justice Department to destroy the Ku Klux Klan in 1871, under the Enforcement Acts. Louisiana during Reconstruction was one of the most politically turbulent, violent, and disputed states. Rival political factions fought for power in the state government, and white insurgents frequently attacked freedmen and their sympathizers, requiring the deployment of federal troops to keep peace.

During January 1872, the War Department was kept on high alert, concerned with the potential for violent confrontation in New Orleans between Gov. Henry Clay Warmoth's faction and that of George W. Carter, former speaker of the Louisiana House. Warmoth supported social equality and voting rights for African Americans, but southern conservatives considered him a corrupt northern carpetbagger. To prevent disorder Major General William H. Emory, Louisville District Commander, in charge of New Orleans, decided that federal troops were needed to prevent violence. Belknap informed General-in-Chief William T. Sherman, supporting Emory's request. On January 5, federal troops were deployed in New Orleans to prevent violence, and were intended to occupy the area until January 11. Sec. Belknap advised President Grant that Emory was the best to make the decision about use of the forces.

On January 9, a street riot broke out after a Gov. Warmoth supporter was assassinated; Gov. Warmoth's state police retaliated by attacking and dispersing Carter's faction at the Gem Saloon. Emory deployed reinforcement troops on January 10 to restore order. On January 12, Grant, wanting to stay out of state politics, told the mayor of New Orleans through the War Department that he would not declare martial law in Louisiana. An angry mob of thousands of Carter's men took to the streets. Emory deployed troops equipped with Gatling guns. Carter's men dispersed, believing that Emory would use U.S. military force to keep the peace.

On January 15, Grant wrote to Belknap that he desired to prevent the "danger of bloodshed" without having to take sides with either faction. On January 16, Att. Gen. George H. Williams told Gov. Warmoth that Grant would take sides only if there was a "clear case of legal right and overruling necessity." On January 22, learning that Gov. Warmoth and Carter had formed rival militias and were preparing for violence, President Grant issued orders through the War Department for Emory to use troops if necessary. When Emory communicated Grant's message to both Gov. Warmoth and Carter, they dispersed their factions and kept peace for 10 months.

=== Eads Bridge commission (1873) ===
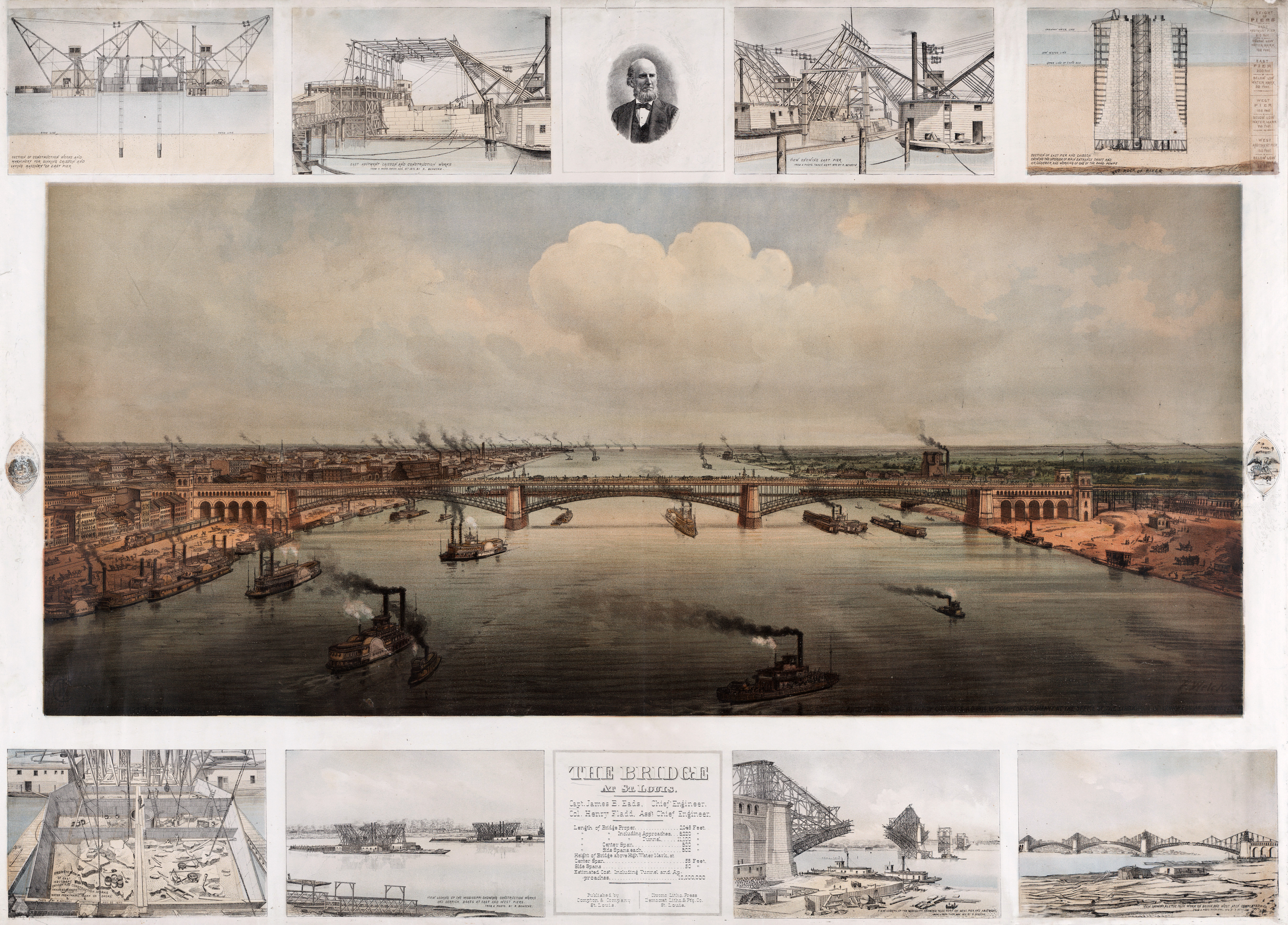
Eads Bridge

In 1873, the construction of the Americas' first steel arched bridge, named after James B. Eads, was nearing completion in St. Louis. Belknap, under influence from the Keokuk Packet steamliner company, was opposed to its completion. He desired that the bridge be torn down, so steamers would not have to lower their smokestacks to sail under it. Belknap created a commission to make recommendations on either destroying the bridge and rebuilding it with a design that allowed steamers to pass or building a canal around the bridge so they could pass. Eads, who was friends with Grant, visited Washington, D.C., in November 1873 before Belknap submitted the report to Congress, and asked that Grant rescue the bridge from destruction. Belknap argued that according to federal law, the Secretary of War had the authority to prevent obstruction of the Mississippi River.

In response, Grant reminded Belknap that Congress had authorized the construction of the bridge, and that Congress would probably not authorize money to tear it down. He overruled Belknap's decision, and told Belknap in person, "You certainly cannot destroy this structure on your own authority...General, you had better drop this case." Belknap was embarrassed, stood up blushing, bowed to President Grant, and left the meeting. The Eads Bridge was completed in 1874 and is still in active use today.

=== Preserved Mathew Brady Civil War photos (1874) ===
In 1872, photographer Mathew Brady went bankrupt; his possessions, including photographs and negatives, were sold to satisfy creditors. In 1874, the owner of a warehouse in New York City offered a set of over 2,000 Brady negatives for sale; Belknap authorized their purchase for $2,500. The negatives were not packed or transported with care, and by the time the War Department took possession, about one-third of them were damaged or destroyed.

Brady subsequently complained to Belknap that none of the $2,500 had gone to him or any of his creditors. During the discussion, Brady offered to sell a second set of negatives; Congress appropriated up to $25,000 for the purchase, and after reviewing the materials and obtaining advice from a War Department attorney as to their value, Belknap authorized payment in full.

As a result of Belknap's initiative, the War Department acquired over 6,000 images of the Civil War era, including photos of prominent military and government officials, battlefields, and defensive works. This collection was subsequently combined with other collections of Brady photos which were purchased by the federal government; they were later catalogued, and are maintained by the National Archives and Records Administration and the Library of Congress.

=== Yellowstone expedition (1875) ===
During the summer of 1875, Belknap decided to explore Yellowstone the nation's first national park, created as the result of a law signed by President Grant on March 2, 1872. Accompanying Belknap were Colonel Randolph B. Marcy, Lieutenant Colonel James W. Forsyth, and Chicago businessman William E. Strong. Leading the expedition was Lieutenant Gustavus C. Doane, who had led the Washburn-Langford-Doane Expedition in 1870, the first extensive federal survey of the Yellowstone territory, that was responsible in part for the formation of the park. Doane left Fort Ellis, where he was stationed, and made preparations for Belknap's party's arrival at Mammoth Hot Springs.

On July 26, Belknap's party reached Fort Ellis and proceeded to meet Doane. Led by Doane, Belknap's party attempted to retrace the original 1870 Expedition in addition to hunting for any big game found on the journey. Belknap's party included 24 soldiers and two ambulances. The two-week expedition proved to be troublesome as Doane was unable to find big game to hunt and after briefly viewing the Grand Canyon of Yellowstone, Belknap's party had to wait several hours before Doane finally found the trail.

=== Great Sioux War (1876) ===
In late July 1874, a U.S. Army expedition under Col. George A. Custer discovered gold in the Black Hills. Soon many gold miners were trespassing on land granted to the Indians under the 1868 Treaty of Fort Laramie. In June 1875, President Grant attempted to resolve the problem by offering Indians $100,000 per year to lease their land or $6,000,000 for the Black Hills. The Lakota Sioux under Chief Red Cloud refused since the offer would require the Sioux to be moved to the Indian Territory in Oklahoma.

On November 3, 1875, as the crisis escalated, President Grant held a secret meeting at the White House including Belknap, Secretary of Interior Zachariah Chandler and general Philip Sheridan. Sheridan told Grant that the U.S. Army was undermanned and the territory involved was vast, requiring great numbers of soldiers to enforce the treaty. Grant, Belknap, and Chandler agreed to a plan that would withdraw U.S. troops from the Black Hills, allowing miners to mine on Indian Territory. According to historian Jeffrey Ostler, the purpose of the troop withdrawal was to start an Indian war.

On December 3, 1875, Chandler ordered all Indians to return to their respected reservations, however, militant Indians under Sitting Bull and Crazy Horse refused to return. By January 1876, 4,000 miners illegally occupied Indian land. When hostile Indians refused to leave their hunting grounds by the January 31 deadline, Chandler turned the Indians over to Belknap's War Department stating "the said Indians are hereby turned over to the War Department for such action on the part of the Army as you [Belknap] may deem proper under the circumstances."

On February 8, 1876, Generals Crook and Terry were ordered to start winter military campaigns against hostile Indians and the Great Sioux War commenced. On March 1, 1876, Crook, in freezing weather, marched north from Fort Fetterman near Douglas, Wyoming to attack Sitting Bull and Crazy Horse and their Indian followers on the Powder River. The following day, March 2, Belknap abruptly resigned office over the Fort Sill trader post-scandal. From March 3 to March 7 the War Department was run ad interim under Secretary of Navy George M. Robeson. On March 8, 1876 Alphonso Taft was appointed by Grant Secretary of War. The Great Sioux War ended in April 1877 under President Rutherford B. Hayes.

=== Corruption, resignation, and House impeachment (1876) ===
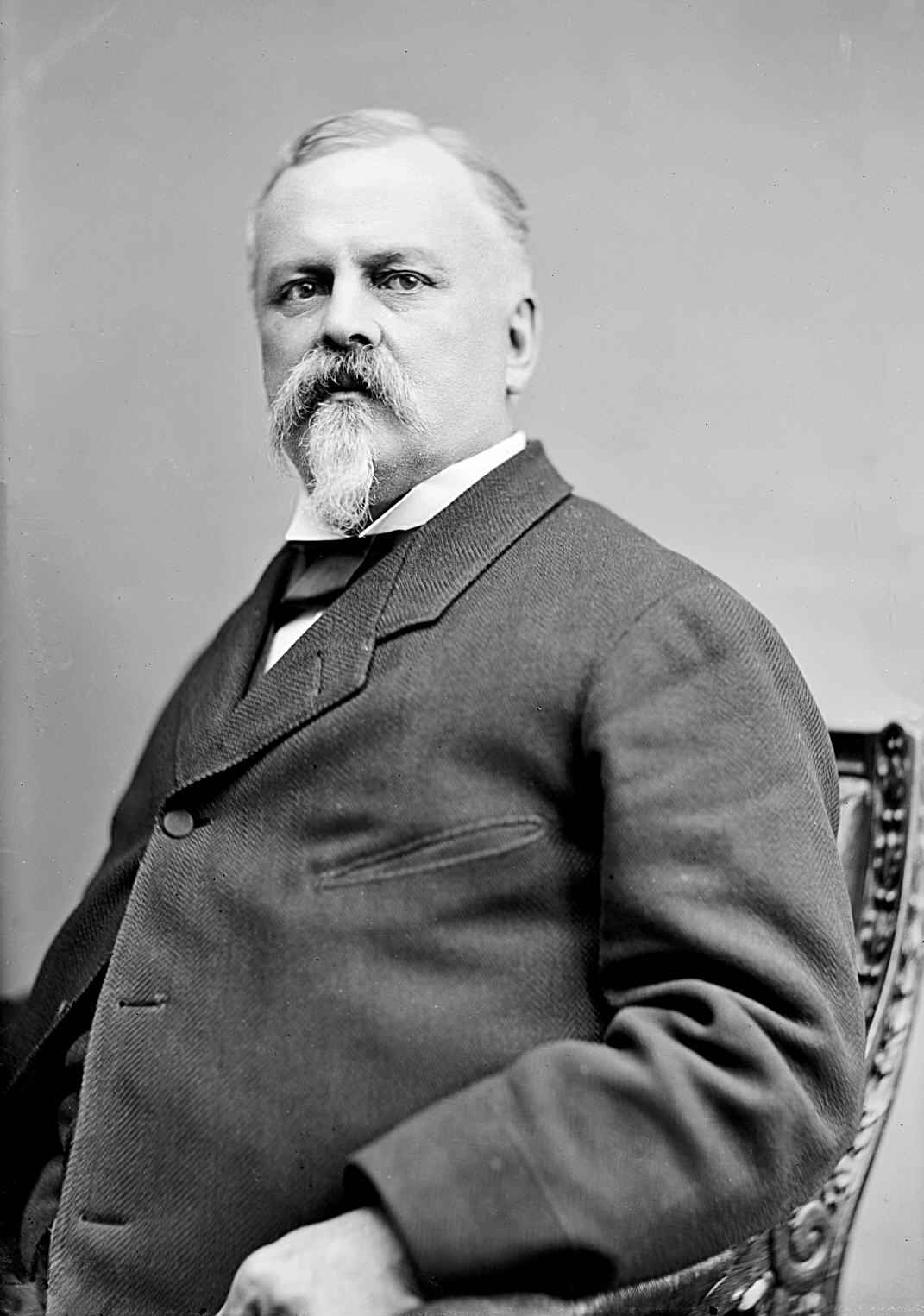
Democratic Congressman Hiester Clymer investigated Belknap's War Department.

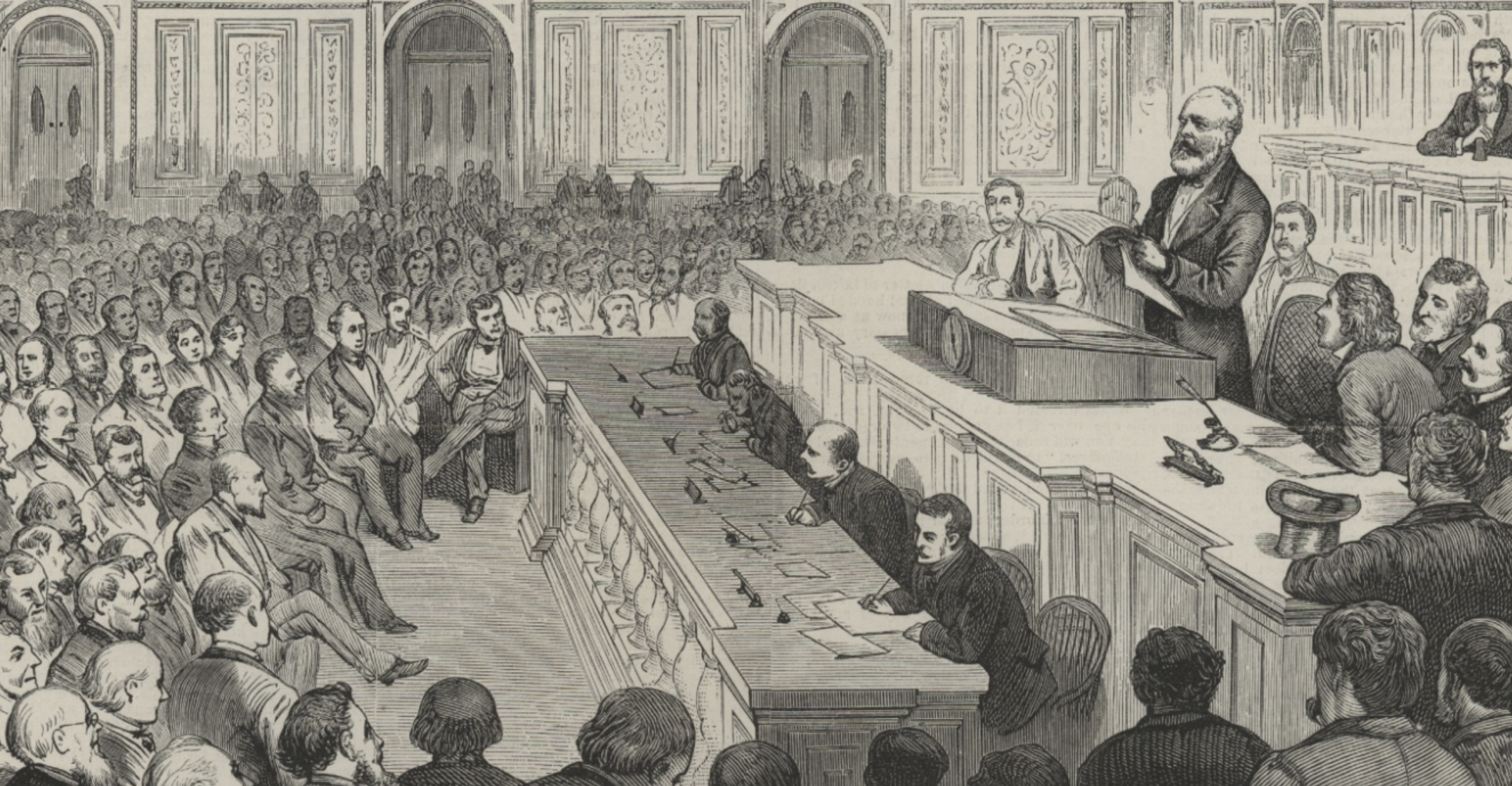
Congressman Clymer reads to the House a report recommending impeachment and a resolution. Illustration from Frank Leslie's Illustrated Newspaper.

On February 29, 1876, rumors that Belknap was receiving profits from traderships reached Representative Hiester Clymer, chairman of the Committee on Expenditures in the Department of War. In response, Clymer launched an investigation into the War Department. Although Clymer and Belknap were friends and had been college roommates, Clymer was a white supremacist who strongly opposed Republican Reconstruction. During Belknap's tenure, the Army was used in combination with the Justice Department to prosecute the Ku Klux Klan, a policy opposed by most Democrats. Caleb P. Marsh testified to the Clymer Committee that Belknap had personally taken Fort Sill tradership profit payments as part of the partnership agreement between Marsh and John S. Evans. On February 29, 1876, Belknap and his counsel went before Clymer's committee, but Belknap declined to testify.

On the morning of March 2, Treasury Secretary Benjamin Bristow told President Grant of Belknap's impending impeachment. After Grant finished breakfast, Secretary Belknap and Secretary Chandler arrived at the White House. Belknap was extremely anxious, openly wept, and confessed to Grant. Belknap handed Grant a one-sentence resignation letter. Grant personally wrote a letter accepting Belknap's resignation, which he placed on a White House mantel at 10:20 a.m.

Clymer's committee was informed at 11:00 a.m. of Belknap's resignation. Although Belknap's resignation initially caused commotion among House members, it did not prevent action by the Clymer committee. The chairman of the House Managers cited authority that as a rule, the law does not recognize fractions of a day and the House saw no cause to make an exception in this case. The committee unanimously passed resolutions to impeach Belknap and drew up five articles of impeachment to be sent to the Senate; thus Belknap had both resigned and would be impeached at "the same time" on March 2, 1876, by a unanimous vote of the House of Representatives. This was the first of two times in US history that a cabinet secretary was ever impeached, the second being the impeachment of Alejandro Mayorkas in 2024.

Speaker of the House Michael C. Kerr wrote to the Senate that Belknap resigned "with intent to evade the proceedings of impeachment against him", although within a few years of the 1797 impeachment of Senator Blount a number of officers including several judges had been threatened with impeachment and resigned to avoid it, after which the proceedings against them were abandoned.

On March 29 and April 4, 1876, George Armstrong Custer testified before the Clymer Committee, which continued to gather evidence for the Senate trial. Custer's testimony was a national media sensation because he accused both Grant's brother and the Secretary of War of corruption. Although Belknap had resigned, he had many political allies in Washington, D.C., including Grant. Custer had previously arrested Grant's son Fred, an Army officer, on the charge of drunkenness. As the result of that incident and his testimony to the Clymer Committee, Custer incurred Grant's displeasure. It took more than a month for Custer to resolve the situation and obtain Grant's permission to return to duty, leading his regiment in the expedition that would culminate with Custer's death at the Battle of the Little Bighorn.

Upon Belknap's sudden resignation in March, Grant had to hastily ask his secretary of navy George M. Robeson to run the War Department ad interim, which lasted a week. Grant then appointed Alphonso Taft Secretary of War; Taft was an attorney and former judge; unfamiliar with military matters, he reluctantly agreed to serve to stabilize the War Department, and Grant promised to nominate him later for another, more suitable position. In May, Grant kept his word when he created a vacancy in the attorney general's post by naming the incumbent, Edwards Pierrepont, to serve as Minister to England; he then appointed Taft to serve as attorney general, and J. Donald Cameron to succeed Taft as secretary of war.

== Senate trial, house arrest, and Senate acquittal ==
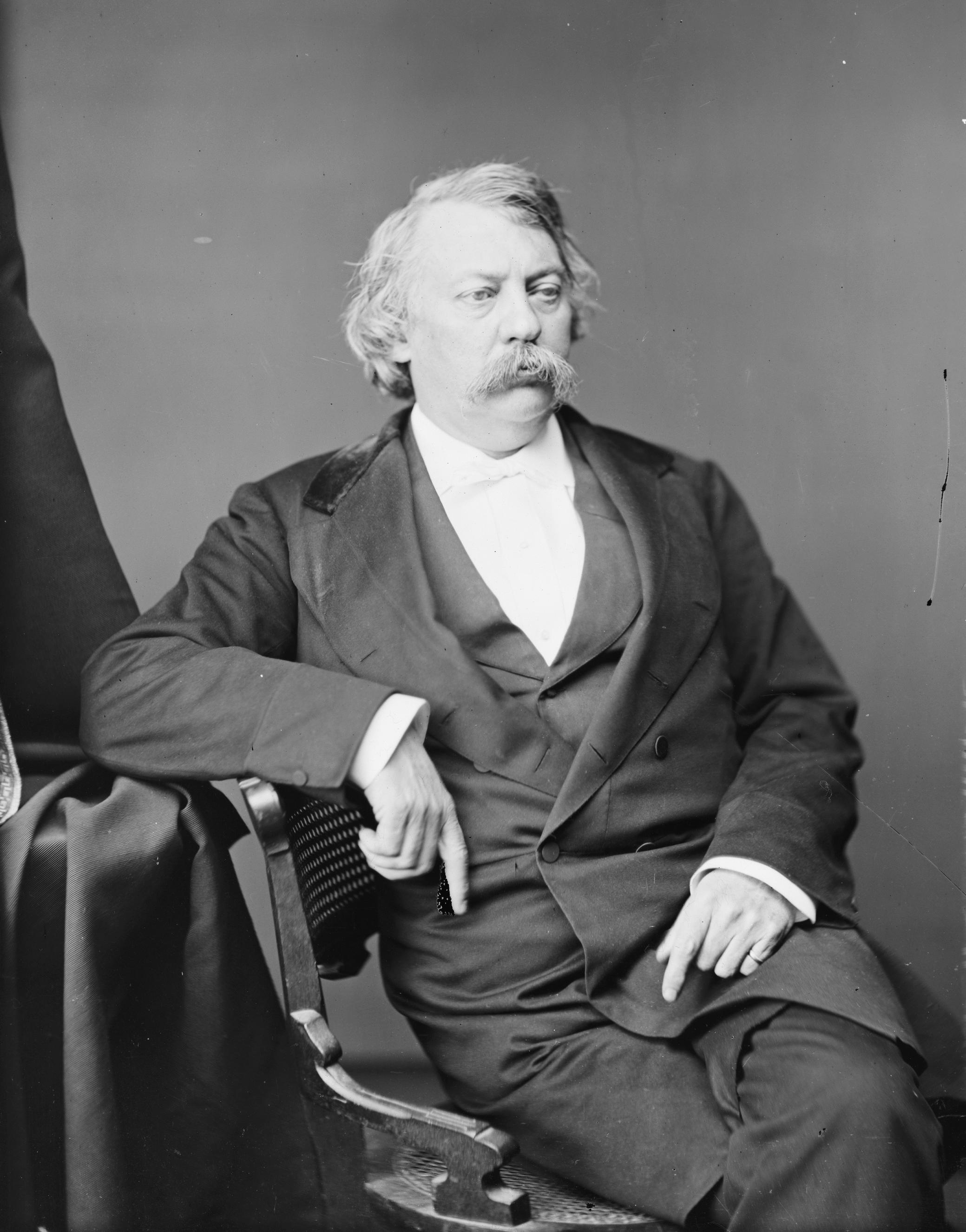
Belknap's Senate trial defender Matthew H. Carpenter

Starting on April 5, 1876, Belknap was tried by the Senate with President pro tempore Thomas W. Ferry presiding. For several weeks senators argued over whether the Senate had jurisdiction to put Belknap on trial since he had already resigned office in March. Belknap's defense managers argued that the Senate had no jurisdiction; the Senate ruled by a vote of 37–29 that it did. Belknap was charged with five articles of impeachment, and the Senate listened to over 40 witnesses. With 40 votes needed for conviction, 25 senators voted no on each of five counts, while the yes votes were 35, 36, 36, 36, and 37, thus acquitting Belknap by failing to reach the required two-thirds majority. All Senators agreed that Belknap took the money from Marsh, but 23 who voted for acquittal believed the Senate did not have jurisdiction. Grant's speedy acceptance of Belknap's resignation undoubtedly saved him from conviction.

After the trial, Belknap's wife and children traveled extensively in Europe. Former senator Matthew H. Carpenter of Wisconsin, who had defended Belknap at the Senate trial, said that Belknap was entirely innocent and that if he outlived Belknap he would clear Belknap's name. Carpenter was reelected to the Senate in 1879, but was in ill health; he died in February 1881 and never produced any new evidence.

On March 4, 1876, one month before his Senate impeachment trial, Grant's Attorney General Edwards Pierrepont had Belknap arrested; as a foe of the Tweed Ring in New York, Pierrepont was seen as a lawyer of integrity, and Grant named him as attorney general to promote reform and anti-corruption within Grant's administration. Grant, who as former commanding general put more scrutiny into military matters than presidents usually did, had ordered Pierrepont to launch a criminal investigation into Belknap's War department. Much to Belknap's anger, Pierrepont put an armed guard around his home to ensure he did not attempt to flee. In May 1876, Grant named Pierrepont Minister to Britain, and appointed his Secretary of War Alphonso Taft to be attorney general.

== Washington, D.C., indictment (1876–1877) ==
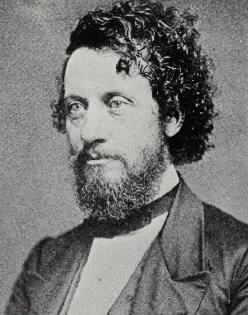
Judge MacArthur dismissed Belknap's Washington D.C. case, pressured by Grant and Attorney General Taft.

After Belknap's Senate acquittal on August 1, the guards around his house were removed; he was indicted by a grand jury on the same day, and set for trial in the District of Columbia federal court. However, journalists and other observers were of the view that the district courts were unlikely to convict, given the number of Grant administration officials who had been accused of corruption and received little or no punishment.

Belknap remained angry at Pierrepont, and threatened to sue him for false imprisonment. On February 2, 1877, Belknap visited Grant and pleaded for his indictment to be dismissed. The next day Grant asked his cabinet for advice; Secretary of State Hamilton Fish was furious at Belknap and wanted him to be tried. Grant decided otherwise, and wrote to Taft that the district attorney should be directed to dismiss the case.

Following Grant's instructions, Taft told Washington, D.C. District Attorney Henry H. Wells that the evidence against Belknap would not sustain a conviction, and that Belknap had suffered enough during the Senate trial. Wells moved for dismissal; on February 8, 1877, Belknap's case, indictment No. 11,262, was dismissed by Justice Arthur MacArthur Sr. No longer facing the possibility of conviction and imprisonment, Belknap decided not to follow through on his threat to sue Pierrepont.

== Later career ==
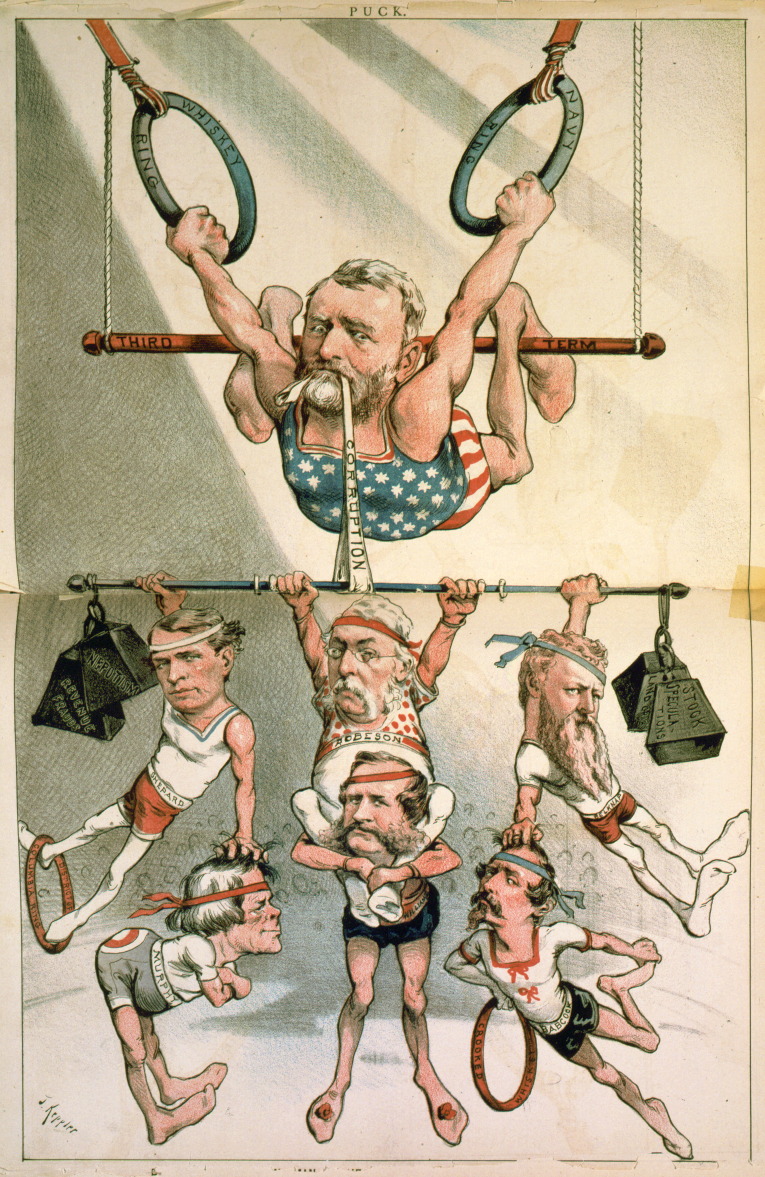
1880 Puck cartoon

Having been disgraced by the Senate trial, Belknap sought to escape from the scrutiny and disapproval of Washington society by moving to Philadelphia. The Belknaps remained married; Amanda and the children visited the Catskills, Coney Island, and other resorts, and Belknap saw them periodically. Belknap later resided in Keokuk, where he practiced law that largely involved representing railroads. Although he was no longer involved in politics or government, Belknap often returned to Washington to represent clients, and maintained a residence and office there.

Years after his impeachment, Belknap's reputation publicly still remained damaged by corruption charges. During the 1880 presidential race, he was among those lampooned in a Puck magazine cartoon (Grant the Acrobat, by Joseph Ferdinand Keppler) opposing Ulysses S. Grant's bid for a third term.

One historian, L.D. Ingersoll, however, defended Belknap in 1880, saying "General Belknap came out of the terrible ordeal with "troops of friends" still standing behind him, notably old army comrades in the army and those who were especially familiar with his conduct of the general affairs of the War Department. These with many public men of the highest standing, insist that he is a much abused man."

Belknap remained popular among his fellow Civil War veterans; in 1887, Belknap coauthored the book History of the Fifteenth Regiment, Iowa Veteran Volunteer Infantry.

== Death, burial and memorial ==
Belknap died suddenly from a massive heart attack in Washington, D.C. on Sunday October 12, 1890. The New York Times stated that his death occurred on Sunday between 1:00 a.m. and 9:00 a.m., and that he died alone at his residence in the Evans building on New York Avenue. Prior to his death, Belknap had played cards with his friends on Saturday night, then retired upstairs for the evening. Belknap's wife, Amanda, was in New York City.

At 8:30 a.m. on Monday morning, Belknap's business associate, John W. Cameron, picked up Belknap's mail on the first floor of Belknap's home, where he maintained his law office, and proceeded to the second floor, where Belknap lived. Cameron and a maid found that all the rooms had been locked. A janitor was summoned to open the doors, and a step ladder was used to peer into Belknap's bedroom. Belknap had placed his hat and coat on a chair and his lifeless body was found on his bed. His left arm had been raised toward his head with his left hand tightly clenched. The bed clothes were disheveled and he appeared to have struggled for breath. The physician who initially examined the body stated that he had died of apoplexy; however, an autopsy by the coroner revealed that Belknap suffered from heart disease. The War Department was notified and received with "genuine sorrow" the news of Belknap's death, since Belknap had been a popular Secretary of War.

Belknap was buried in Section 1 at Arlington National Cemetery on October 16, 1890. The ceremony was conducted by St. John's Episcopal Church. The site features a granite gravestone with a bronze relief memorial designed by sculptor Carl Rohl-Smith. The bronze relief (2 ft × 2 ft) bust shows Belknap wearing a dress uniform with his hair parted on the right side as well as a long, full beard. The relief is located on the front of a granite base (6 ft × 5 ft × 5 ft). This piece was surveyed by the Smithsonian's Save Outdoor Sculpture! survey in 1995 and its condition was described as "Treatment being needed". The relief is signed by the artist: C.R. 1897.

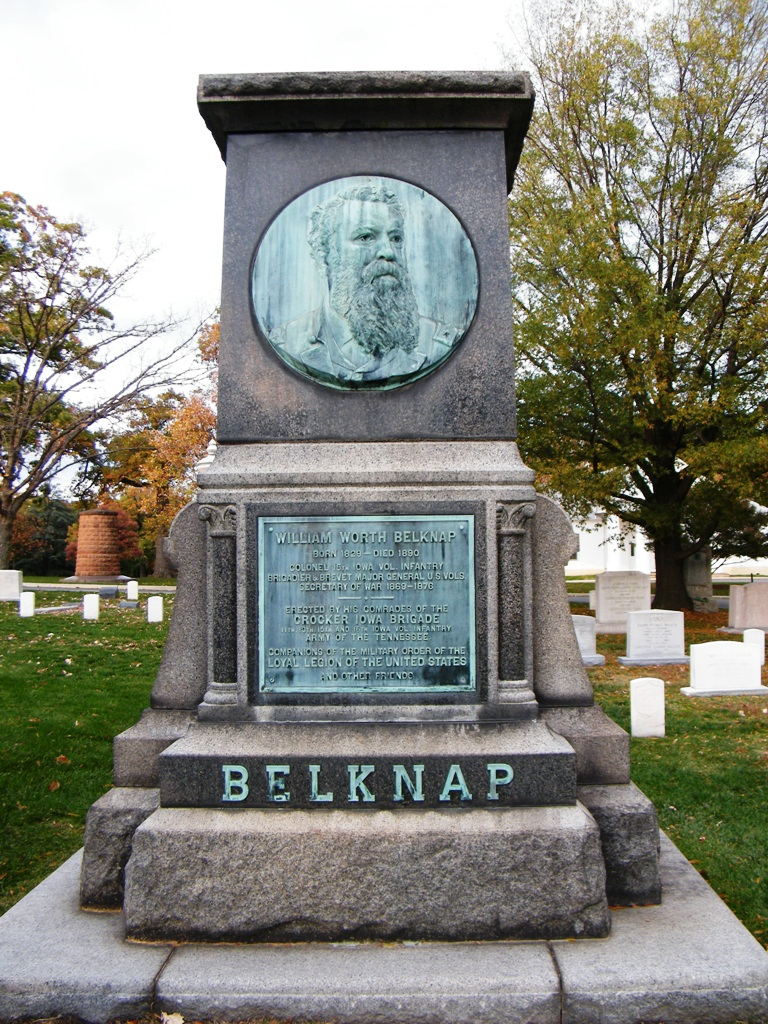
Belknap Gravestone and Memorial Front

A plaque on the front of the granite base is inscribed:

WILLIAM WORTH BELKNAP
BORN 1829 – DIED 1890
COLONEL 15TH IOWA VOL. INFANTRY
BRIGADIER & BREVET MAJOR GENERAL U.S.VOLS.
SECRETARY OF WAR 1869–1876
ERECTED BY HIS COMRADES OF THE
CROCKER IOWA BRIGADE
11TH, 13TH, 15TH AND 16TH IOWA VOL. INFANTRY
ARMY OF THE TENNESSEE.
COMPANIONS OF THE MILITARY ORDER OF THE
LOYAL LEGION OF THE UNITED STATES
AND OTHER FRIENDS

== Historical reputation ==
Prior to Belknap's 1876 shocking resignation, Belknap's reputation was one of a war hero who honorably served the Union Army. There were no rumors of corruption while he served under Johnson as a Treasury collector. Even up to 1876, Belknap, under Grant, was believed to be a faithful judicious Secretary of War, publicly recognized for aiding and protecting 100,000 homeless Chicago fire victims.

In 2003 biographer Edward S. Cooper described Belknap as a man of virtues and flaws. According to Cooper, Belknap "willingly turned to graft to support the social ambitions of his wives" while living a lavish lifestyle in Washington, D.C., at the expense of soldiers and Indians during the Gilded Age. Belknap is positively credited by Cooper for creating and expanding the weather bureau, reforming the military justice system, and for preserving Mathew Brady's photographic record of the Civil War. Belknap's abrupt and controversial resignation in March 1876 caused an unprecedented succession of four Secretaries of War within a 13-month time period: Belknap, Alphonso Taft, J. Donald Cameron, and George W. McCrary.

In Keokuk, Belknap is remembered for being one of its "colorful citizens" and he has two streets named after him. He was commended by his Army colleagues for his coolness under fire during the Civil War, but his reputation suffered as the result of his forced resignation as Grant's Secretary of War, which took place under a cloud amid suspicions of misconduct.

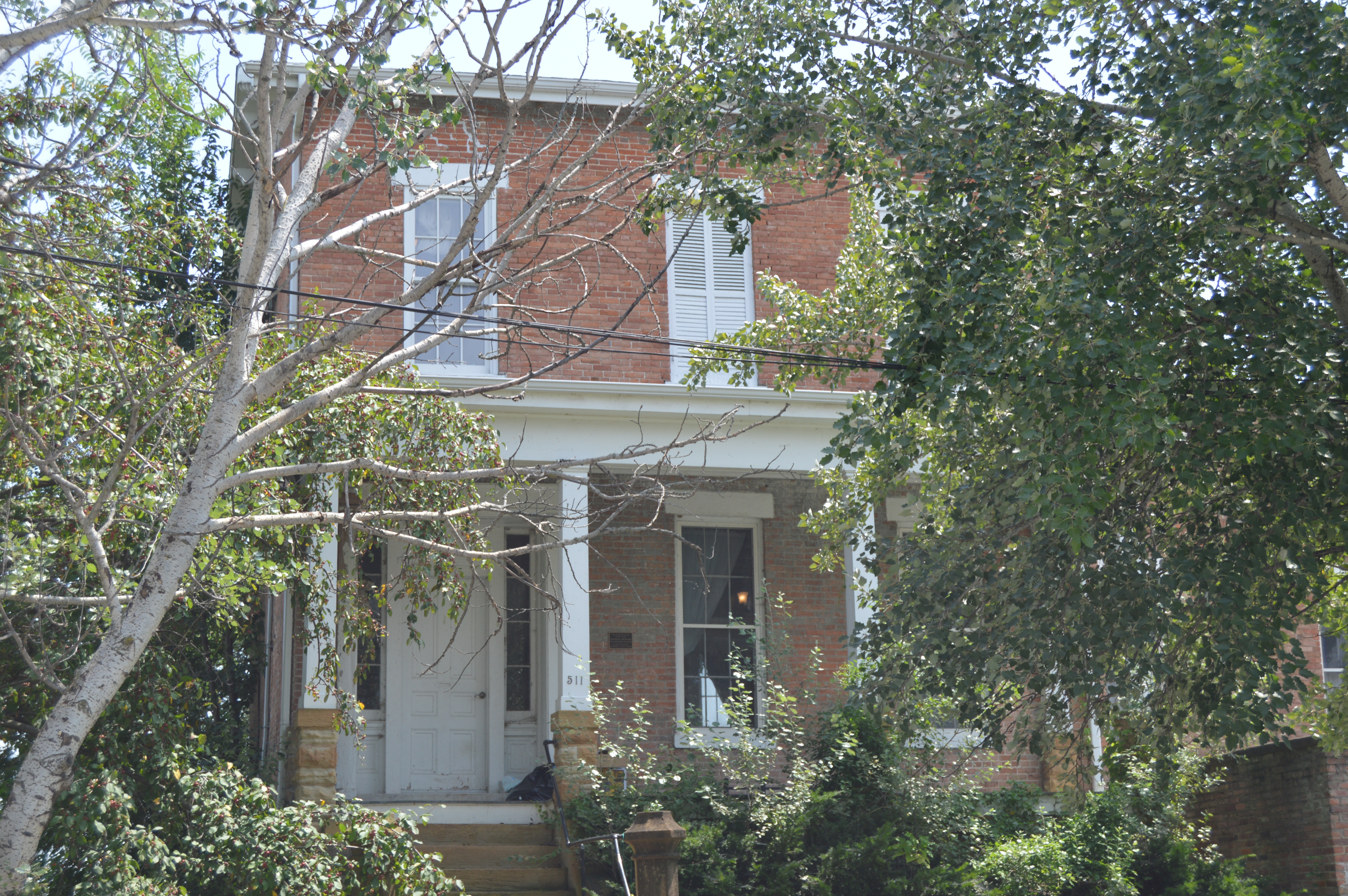
Belknap's home in Keokuk, built in 1854

Belknap's name resurfaced in January 2021, due to the similarity between Belknap's 1876 impeachment trial and President Donald Trump's 2021 impeachment trial, since both had left office by the time the trial had commenced.

Andra Belknap, a Belknap descendant, said, "William Worth Belknap was by many accounts a hero of the Civil War. He served the Union Army, and during the Battle of Shiloh, he was injured and had his horse shot down under him. And still, he continued in battle. During the Battle of Atlanta, he personally took a Confederate officer prisoner (supposedly dragging the man by the collar across the battlefield). His Civil War heroism, however, has been largely forgotten by history — even forgotten by his own family. His impeachment is what remains in the history books."

== Legacy ==
A collection of his family's records and papers and several boxes of letters received by Belknap are located at Princeton University, where he was a member of the class of 1848.

His son Hugh R. Belknap served as a U.S. congressman from Illinois.

Mount Belknap in Utah is named in his honor.

== List of Indian campaigns, battles, and wars involving the United States ==
- Yavapai Wars (1861–1875)
- Comanche Campaign (1867–1875)
- Battle of Summit Springs (1869)
- Marias Massacre (1870)
- Camp Grant massacre (1871)
- Modoc War (1872–1873)
- Battle of Salt River Canyon (1872)
- Battle of Turret Peak (1873)
- Red River War (1874–1875)
- Second Battle of Adobe Walls (1874)
- Battle of the Upper Washita River (1874)
- Battle of Palo Duro Canyon (1874)
- Battle of Sunset Pass (1874)
- Battle of Snake Mountain (1874)
- Las Cuevas War (1875)
- Great Sioux War (1876–1877)

Note: Although the Great Sioux War began in February 1876 under Belknap's tenure, no significant battles were fought between the beginning of the war and up to his sudden resignation in March. The war, lasting until April 1877, took place under five cabinet secretaries. Four under President Grant: Belknap, George M. Robeson (ad interum), Alphonso Taft, and J. Donald Cameron, and one under President Rutherford B. Hayes, George W. McCrary.

== See also ==
- List of American Civil War generals (Union)
- Gen. William Worth Belknap House, listed on the National Register of Historic Places in Iowa

== Sources ==
=== Books ===
- Behncke, Ted; Bloomfield, Gary (2020). Custer. Philadelphia & Oxford: Casemate. ISBN 978-1-61200-889-9.
- Belknap, William W.; Tyler, Loren S. (1887). William W. Belknap (ed.). History of the Fifteenth Regiment, Iowa Veteran Volunteer Infantry. Keokuk, Iowa: R.B. Ogden & Son, Print.
- Brands, H. W. (2012). The Man Who Saved the Union: Ulysses S. Grant in War and Peace. New York: Doubleday. ISBN 978-0-385-53241-9.
- Bonekemper, Edward H. (2012). Grant and Lee. Washington, DC: Regnery History. ISBN 978-1-62157-010-3.
- Cooper, Edward S. (2003). William Worth Belknap: an American Disgrace. Cranbury, New Jersey: Rosemont Publishing & Printing Corp. ISBN 0-8386-3990-9.
- Chernow, Ron (2017). Grant. New York: Penguin Press. ISBN 978-1-5942-0487-6.
- Coakley, Robert W. (1988). Davis S. Trask (ed.). The Role of Federal Military Forces in Domestic Disorders, 1789–1878. Army Historical Series. Washington, D.C.: Center of Military History United States Army.
- Dawson III, Joseph G. (1982). Army Generals and Reconstruction: Louisiana, 1862–1877. Louisiana State University: Louisiana State University Press. ISBN 978-0-8071-1960-0.
- Donovan, James (2008). A Terrible Glory: Custer and the Little Bighorn. New York City: Little, Brown, and Company. ISBN 978-0-316-15578-6.
- Hinds, Asher C. (1907). Hinds' Precedents of the House of Representatives of the United States. Vol. III. Washington, D.C.: US Government Printing Office. pp. 903–903, 922, 934.
- Hofling, Charles K. (1981). Custer and the Little Big Horn: A Psychobiographical Inquiry. Detroit: Wayne State University Press. ISBN 0-8143-1814-2.
- Ingersoll, L.D. (1880). A History of the War Department of the United States. Washington D.C.: Francis B. Mohun. pp. 566–571.
- Lamphier, Peg A. (2003). Kate Chase and William Sprague: Politics and Gender in a Civil War Marriage. Lincoln, Nebraska: University of Nebraska Press. ISBN 0-8032-2947-X.
- McFeely, William S. (1981). Grant: A Biography. New York City: W.W. Norton & Company, LTD. ISBN 0-393-01372-3.
- Miller, Donald L. (2019). Vicksburg: Grant's Campaign That Broke the Confederacy. Simon and Schuster. ISBN 978-1-4516-4137-0.
- Purcell, L. Edward (2008). David Hudson; Marvin Bergman; Loren Horton (eds.). The Biographical Dictionary of Iowa. Iowa City: University of Iowa Press. pp. 33–34. ISBN 978-1-58729-685-7.
- Smith, Jean Edward (2001). Grant. New York City: Simon & Schuster. ISBN 0-684-84927-5.
- White, Ronald C. (2016). American Ulysses: A Life of Ulysses S. Grant. Random House Publishing Group. ISBN 978-1-5883-6992-5.

=== Articles ===
- Koster, John (June 2010). "The Belknap Scandal Fulcrum to Disaster". Wild West: 58–64.

=== Newspapers ===
- "Belknap's Sudden Death" (PDF). New York Times. October 14, 1890.
- "Gen. Belknap's Career" (PDF). New York Times. March 3, 1876.
- "A Sad Week For The Capital" (PDF). New York Times. March 6, 1876.
- Sloat, Jerry (January 26, 2017). "Belknap was one of Keokuk's colorful citizens". Fort Madison Daily Democrat. Fort Madison, Iowa.
- "The War Department. Annual Report of the Secretary of War on the Operations of the Department for the Year 1871" (PDF). New York Times, New York. December 4, 1871.

=== Dictionaries ===
- Rossiter Johnson, ed. (1906). Biographical Dictionary of America Belknap, William Worth. Boston: American Biographical Society. pp. 280–281.
- Dictionary of American Biography William Worth Belknap. New York City: Charles Scribner's Sons. 1936.
- Chisholm, Hugh, ed. (1911). "Belknap, William Worth" . Encyclopædia Britannica. Vol. 3 (11th ed.). Cambridge University Press. p. 684.

=== Internet ===
- Glass, Andrew (May 5, 2017). "Senate holds former war secretary's impeachment trial, May 4, 1876". politico.com.
- Belknap, Andra (January 14, 2021). "Congress impeached and tried my ancestor after he left office. Trump could be next". USA Today.
- Gaard, Tom (January 23, 2021). "Trump impeachment resurfaces Iowan William Belknap's roller-coaster 19th-century story". Des Moines Register.

Political offices
Preceded by John Aaron Rawlins	United States Secretary of War; 1869–1876	Succeeded by Alphonso Taft
