= Gen. William Worth Belknap House =

Historic house in Iowa, United States

- U.S. National Register of Historic Places
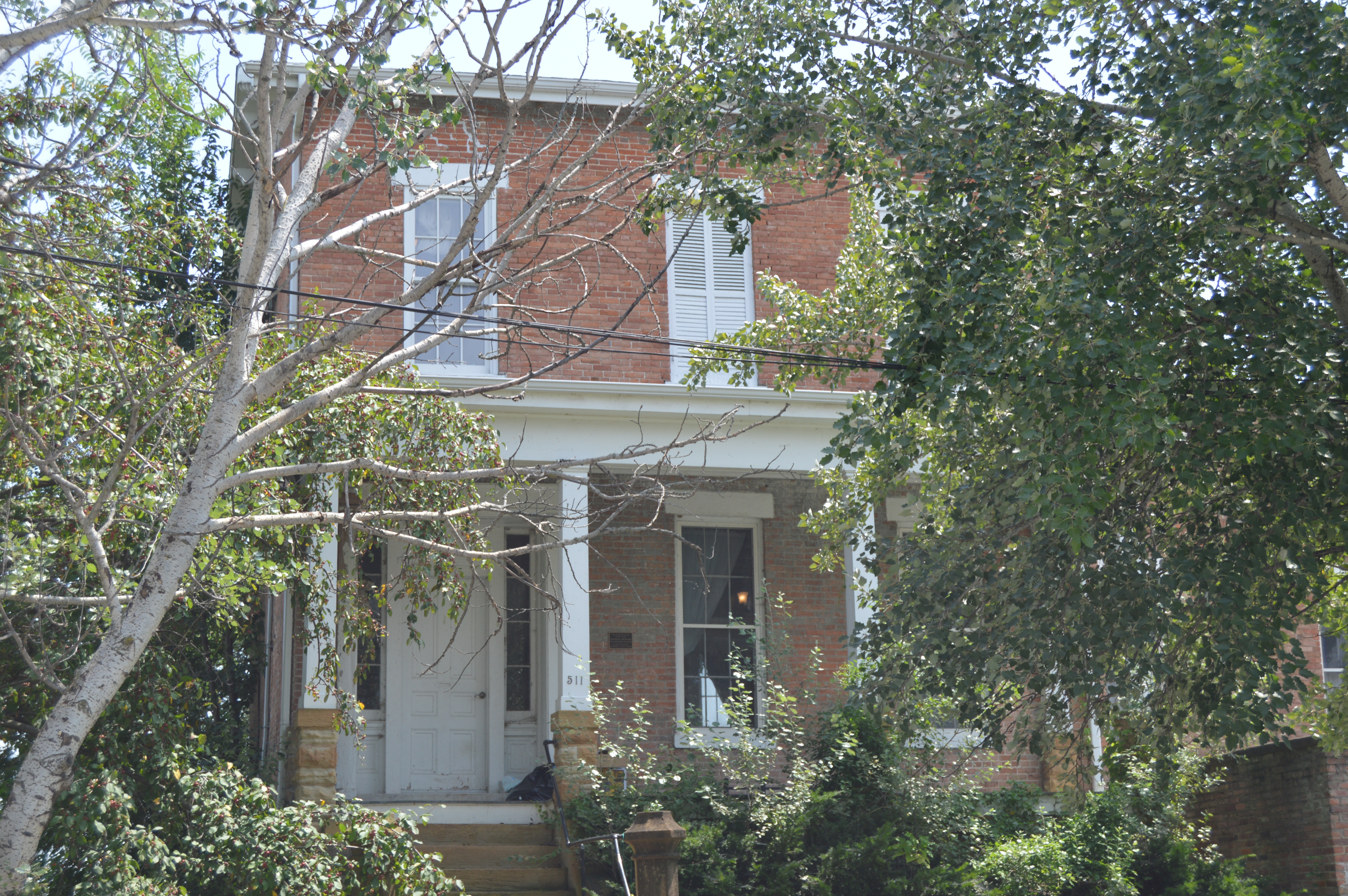
- Front, seen from the street

- Location within Iowa Location within the United States
- Location: 511 N. 3rd St. Keokuk, Iowa
- Coordinates: 40°23′50″N 91°22′33″W
- Area: less than one acre
- Built: 1854
- Architectural style: Greek Revival
- NRHP reference No.: 75000694
- Added to NRHP: October 10, 1975

The Gen. William Worth Belknap House is a historic building located in Keokuk, Iowa, United States. William Worth Belknap moved to Keokuk from upstate New York in 1853 to practice law. He built this Greek Revival style house the following year. It is a two-story brick structure with a single-story wing. The two-story section is original, while the single-story section is an addition, built shortly afterward. The house features narrow window openings with simple stone lintels and sills. It is built on a stone foundation covered with concrete and capped with a low-pitched gable roof whose ridge is parallel to the street. The front porch is not original. Belknap resided here with his mother and two sisters.

The significance of the house is its association with Belknap. During his ownership, he was involved in several battles during the American Civil War and was brevetted a major general. He served as Secretary of War under President Ulysses S. Grant. Belknap was impeached by the House of Representatives for improper conduct by selling army post traderships. After he resigned his cabinet post, he sold this house and moved to Philadelphia. The house was listed on the National Register of Historic Places in 1975.
