= Rawlings (surname) =

- Language: English

Origin
- Language: English
- Meaning: Son of Ralph
- Region of origin: England

Other names
- Variant forms: Rawlins, etc

Rawlings is an English-language surname. Notable people with the name include:

- Angela Rawlings (born 1978), Canadian author and poet (also known as "a.rawlings")
- Archibald Rawlings (1891–1952), English footballer
- Barney Rawlings (1920–2004), American bomber pilot in World War II
- Bec Rawlings (born 1989), Australian mixed martial artist and bare-knuckle boxer
- Bernard Rawlings (Royal Navy officer) (1889–1962), British admiral of World War II
- Brady Rawlings (born 1981), Australian rules footballer
- David Rawlings (born 1969), American guitar player
- Donnell Rawlings (born 1968), American actor and comedian
- Doug Rawlings (born 1964), Australian rugby league footballer
- Edmund Charles Rawlings (1854–1917), English politician
- Edward Rawlings (1870–1955), American politician
- Edwin W. Rawlings (1904–1997), U.S. Air Force general
- Florence Rawlings (born 1988), English singer
- George C. Rawlings (1921–2009), American politician
- Grace Rawlings (1909–1988), British educational psychologist
- Hunter R. Rawlings III (born 1944), American classics scholar
- H. Ripley Rawlings IV (born 1971), American novelist
- Ian Rawlings (born 1959), Australian actor
- Jack Rawlings (1923–2016), English footballer
- Jade Rawlings (born 1977), Australian rules footballer
- James B. Rawlings (born 1957), American chemical engineering professor
- James Wilson Rawlings (1929–2013), American diplomat
- Jerry Rawlings (1947–2020), Ghanaian politician and military leader
- John Rawlings, multiple people
- Josh Rawlings (born 1982), American pianist, songwriter and record producer
- Maurice E. Rawlings (1906–1982), Justice of the Iowa Supreme Court
- Maurice S. Rawlings (1922–2010), American cardiologist and author
- Nana Konadu Agyeman Rawlings (1948–2025), Ghanaian First Lady and politician
- Norberto James Rawlings (1945–2021), Dominican poet
- Margaret Rawlings (1906–1996), English stage actress
- Marjorie Kinnan Rawlings (1896–1953), American author of short-stories and novels
- Menna Rawlings (born 1967), British diplomat
- Moses Rawlings (1745–1809), colonel in the American Revolution who fought for the American army
- Noah Rawlings, American writer and singer-songwriter
- Patricia Rawlings, Baroness Rawlings (born 1939), British politician
- Pat Rawlings (born 1955) is an American technical illustrator and space artist
- Pete Rawlings (1937–2003), American politician
- Peter Rawlings (born 1951), English professor of literature
- Richard Rawlings (born 1969), American entrepreneur and media personality
- Rob Roy Rawlings (1920–2001), American politician
- Ross Rawlings (born 1966/1967), American pianist, composer, conductor, and music director
- Roy Rawlings (footballer) (1921–2014), Australian rules footballer
- Roy Willard Rawlings (1883–1973), American politician
- Sid Rawlings (1913–1956), English professional footballer
- Steve Rawlings (born 1957), American attorney and politician
- Steven Rawlings (1961–2012), British astrophysicist; one of the lead scientists in the Square Kilometre Array project
- Spike Rawlings (1944–2006), English footballer and TV entertainer
- Terry Rawlings (1933–2019), English film and sound editor
- Tim Rawlings (1932–2014), English footballer
- Wendy Rawlings (born 1967), American novelist, short story writer, essayist, and critic
- William Rawlings, multiple people

== See also ==
- Rawling, surname
