= John Rawlinson =

John Rawlinson may refer to:

- John Rawlinson (priest) (1576–1631), English churchman and academic
- John Rawlinson (politician) (1860–1926), England footballer and Member of Parliament
- John Rawlinson (cricketer, born 1867) (1867–1945), English cricketer
- Spike Rawlings (John Anderson Rawlinson, 1944–2006), English footballer turned TV entertainer
- John Rawlinson (cricketer, born 1959), English cricketer and artist
