= Rawding =

Rawding is a surname. Notable people with the surname include:

- Merrill D. Rawding (1905–2004), Canadian politician
- Mike Rawding (1936–2005), English football coach and administrator

== See also ==
- Rawling
