= Bernard Rawlings =

Bernard Rawlings may refer to:

- Sir Bernard Rawlings (Royal Navy officer) (1889–1962), British admiral of World War II
- Barney Rawlings (Bernard Wayne Rawlings, 1920–2004), American bomber pilot in World War II
