= Maurice Rawlings =

Maurice Rawlings may refer to:

- Maurice E. Rawlings (1906–1982), Justice of the Iowa Supreme Court
- Maurice S. Rawlings (1922–2010), American cardiologist and author
