= Heath Cemetery, Harbonnieres =

CWGC cemetery in France

Heath Cemetery in Harbonnières
- Interactive map of Heath Cemetery in Harbonnières

Details
- Coordinates: 49°52′21″N 2°40′20″E
- Find a Grave: Heath Cemetery in Harbonnières

Heath Cemetery in Harbonnières, France is a cemetery operated by the Commonwealth War Graves Commission, for British Empire soldiers of the Somme campaign during World War I.

Heath Cemetery is situated on the south side of the main road (D1029) from Amiens to St Quentin, approximately 3km north to northeast of the village Harbonnières and 13 km east from Villers-Bretonneux. The cemetery has 1860 plots and was designed by Sir Reginald Blomfield.

Located in the Somme, Harbonnières was captured by French troops in the summer of 1916, retaken by the Germans on 27 April 1918, and regained by the Australian Corps on 8 August 1918.

== Notable burials ==
- Robert Beatham, recipient of the Victoria Cross
- Eric Brookes, British World War I flying ace
- Michael Gonne, World War I flying ace
- Alfred Gaby, recipient of the Victoria Cross
- William Reginald Rawlings, first Aboriginal commissioned officer in Australian Military Forces
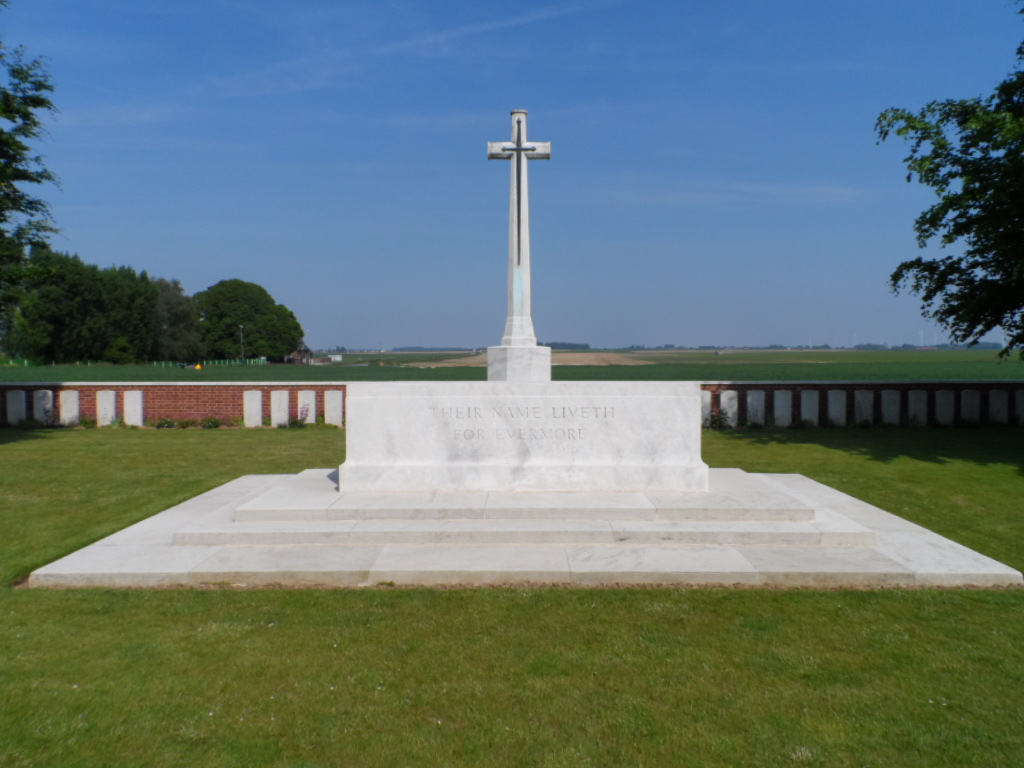
Stone of Remembrance and Cross of Sacrifice

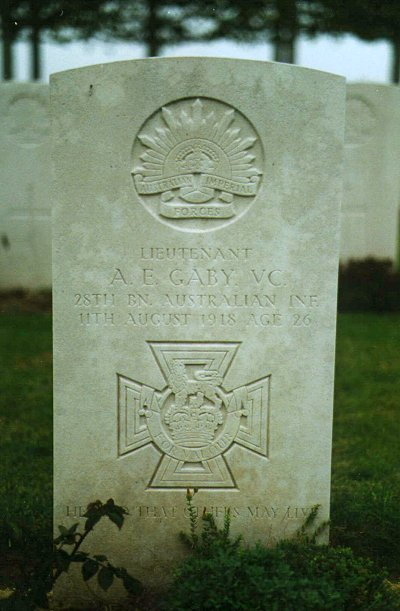
Alfred Gaby's grave

== See also ==
- Mont Saint-Quentin Australian war memorial
- Villers–Bretonneux Australian National Memorial
