= Michael Gonne =

British World War I flying ace (1899–1918)

Michael Edward Gonne
- Born: 1899
- Died: c. 8 August 1918 (aged 19); Villers-Carbonnel, France
- Burial place: Heath Cemetery, Harbonnières, France
- Military career
- Allegiance: United Kingdom
- Branch: British Army; Royal Air Force
- Service years: 1916–1918
- Rank: Captain
- Units: Royal Fusiliers; No. 54 Squadron RFC/RAF
- Conflicts: World War I
- Awards: Military Cross

Captain Michael Edward Gonne was a World War I flying ace credited with five aerial victories.

== Biography ==
Gonne was the younger son of Henry and Grace Staveley Gonne, of Ringwood, Hampshire. He was educated at Westminster School, and then attended the Royal Military College, Sandhurst, as a cadet. On 27 October 1916 he was commissioned as a second lieutenant in the Royal Fusiliers. He was soon seconded to the Royal Flying Corps, being appointed a flying officer on 23 May 1917.

Gonne was assigned to No. 54 Squadron, and flew Sopwith Pup no. A6215 to victory on 25 September and 18 October 1917, destroying Albatros D.IIIs on both occasions. His third victory came on 5 January 1918, driving down an enemy aircraft 'out of control'. On 9 January Gonne was appointed a flight commander with the acting rank of captain. His fourth and fifth victories both came on 25 January, driving down an Albatros D.V, and sending a Rumpler C down in flames. His final tally was three enemy aircraft destroyed, two driven down out of control. Gonne was awarded the Military Cross on 1 March, and promoted to lieutenant on 27 April.

After some months on home service, he returned to France at his own request to take part in the Allied offensive. Gonne was reported as missing on 8 August 1918; having last been seen flying over the Somme River at Brie, some 15 miles behind the German front lines. In The Times of 12 December 1918 it was reported that he had died in a German field hospital at Villers-Carbonnel. He is buried in Heath Cemetery in Harbonnières, France.

== Honours and awards ==
Military Cross
Second Lieutenant (Temporary Captain) Michael Edward Gonne, Royal Fusiliers and Royal Flying Corps.

For conspicuous gallantry and devotion to duty. He is a daring and skilful leader of patrols, and has led his flight throughout a large amount of fighting, often against superior numbers, far over the enemy's lines. He has destroyed five enemy machines.
