= Rawlins =

Rawlins may refer to:

== People ==
- Rawlins (surname)

== Places ==
- Rawlins, Wyoming
- Rawlins County, Kansas
- Rawlins Cross, St. John's
- Rawlins Township, Jo Daviess County, Illinois

== Schools ==
- Rawlins Community College

== Music ==
- Rawlins Cross - Newfoundland Celtic Rock band

== See also ==
- Rawlings (disambiguation)
