= Eric Brookes =

British World War I flying ace (1894–1918)

Eric Guy Brookes
- Born: 1894; Gloucester, Gloucestershire, England
- Died: 8 August 1918 (aged 23–24); Vicinity of Harbonnières
- Burial place: Heath Cemetery, Harbonnières, Somme, France
- Military career
- Allegiance: United Kingdom
- Branch: British Army; Royal Air Force
- Rank: Captain
- Unit: No. 65 Squadron RAF
- Awards: Distinguished Flying Cross

Captain Eric Guy Brookes DFC (1894 – 8 August 1918) was a British World War I flying ace credited with six aerial victories.

== Biography ==
Brookes was commissioned as second lieutenant on 27 June 1917, attached to the Worcestershire Regiment. On 6 January 1918 he was transferred to the Royal Flying Corps, and was posted to No. 65 Squadron, flying the Sopwith Camel.

His first victory came on 25 May, destroying an Albatros D.V over Albert. On 18 June he claimed a Fokker Dr.I set on fire and also an Albatros D.V driven down out of control while over Morcourt. On 2 July he drove down a Pfalz D.III at Bayonvillers, bringing his score to four. On 19 July Brookes was promoted to the temporary rank of captain while serving as a flight commander.

He was awarded the Distinguished Flying Cross on 1 August, the citation reading:

Lieutenant Eric Guy Brookes.

While leading a patrol of six machines, escort to a bombing formation, he drove off a patrol of fifteen enemy scouts that was about to attack the bombers, shooting down one of the scouts in flames, and so enabled the bombers to complete their task. After protecting another bombing formation from a threatened attack, he escorted a third formation, to and from the lines, although by that time the number of his machines was reduced to three. On the last journey two enemy triplanes attacked one of the bombers, whose observer had been killed; engaging them, he drove one down out of control and forced the other to retire. He is a skilful and fearless officer, who has done excellent work in reconnaissance and in attacking enemy troops close to the ground.

Just after midday on 8 August, Brookes, and Lieutenants Joseph White, George Tod, F. Edsted, C. Tolley, and D. Oxley, forced down two German Fokker D.VII fighters behind the Allied lines at Proyart, where they were captured. Brookes set off on another sortie later in the day and did not return. He was shot down north of Harbonnières, and is interred at the Heath Cemetery there.
