= Reg Saunders =

Australian Army officer (1920–1990)

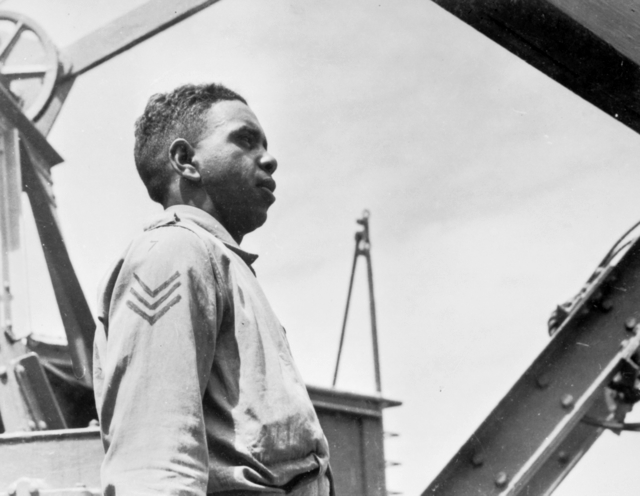
- Reg Saunders in 1940
- Born: Reginald Walter Saunders; 7 August 1920; Framlingham, Victoria
- Died: 2 March 1990 (aged 69); Sydney, New South Wales
- Military career
- Allegiance: Australia
- Branch: Australian Army
- Service years: 1940–45; 1950–54
- Rank: Captain
- Units: 2/7th Battalion (1940–45); 3 RAR (1950–51)
- Conflicts: Second World War; North African campaign; Battle of Greece; Battle of Crete; Salamaua–Lae campaign; Aitape–Wewak campaign; Korean War; Battle of Kapyong; Battle of Maryang San
- Awards: Member of the Order of the British Empire
- Other work: Department of Aboriginal Affairs

Reginald Walter Saunders, MBE (7 August 1920 – 2 March 1990) was the first Aboriginal Australian to be commissioned as an officer in the Australian Army. He came from a military family, his forebears having served in the Boer War and the First World War. Enlisting as a soldier in 1940, he saw action during the Second World War in North Africa, Greece and Crete, before being commissioned as a lieutenant and serving as a platoon commander in New Guinea during 1944–1945. His younger brother Harry also joined the Army, and was killed in 1942 during the Kokoda Track campaign.

After the war, Saunders was discharged and returned to civilian life. He later served as a company commander with the 3rd Battalion, Royal Australian Regiment (3 RAR) during the Korean War, where he fought at the Battle of Kapyong. Saunders left the Army in 1954 and worked in the logging and metal industries, before joining the Office of Aboriginal Affairs (later the Department of Aboriginal Affairs) as a liaison officer in 1969. In 1971, he was appointed a Member of the Order of the British Empire (MBE) for his community service. He died in 1990, aged 69.

== Early life and education ==
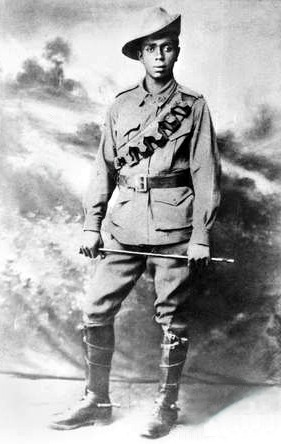
Reg Saunders' father Chris, while serving with the Australian Imperial Force, c. 1916

Saunders was born near Purnim on the Aboriginal Reserve at Framlingham in western Victoria on 7 August 1920. He was a member of the Gunditjmara people. His father, Chris, was a veteran of the First World War, having served as a machine gunner in the Australian Imperial Force. One of his uncles, William Reginald Rawlings, who was killed in action and after whom Saunders was named, had been awarded the Military Medal for service with the 29th Battalion in France. Another ancestor, John Brook, fought with the Victorian Rifles and the Australian Commonwealth Horse in the Boer War. Saunders' mother died in 1924 from complications caused by pneumonia while giving birth to her third child, a girl who also died. After this, his father moved to Lake Condah in Victoria, with Reg and his younger brother, Harry, born in 1922. As their father undertook various labouring jobs, the two boys were raised largely by their grandmother.

Saunders attended the local mission school at Lake Condah, where he did well in maths, geometry and languages. His father, meanwhile, taught Reg and Harry about the bush, and encouraged them to read Shakespeare and Australian literature. After completing eight years of schooling, Saunders earned his merit certificate.

His formal education thus ended, he went to work at the age of 14 as a millhand in a sawmill. Employers regularly withheld payments for Aboriginal labourers at this time, but Saunders refused to work unless he was paid his full entitlement, and his employer relented. He worked and furthered his education until 1937, when he went into business with his father and brother, operating a sawmill in Portland, Victoria; the sawmill was destroyed in a bushfire in 1939.

== Second World War ==
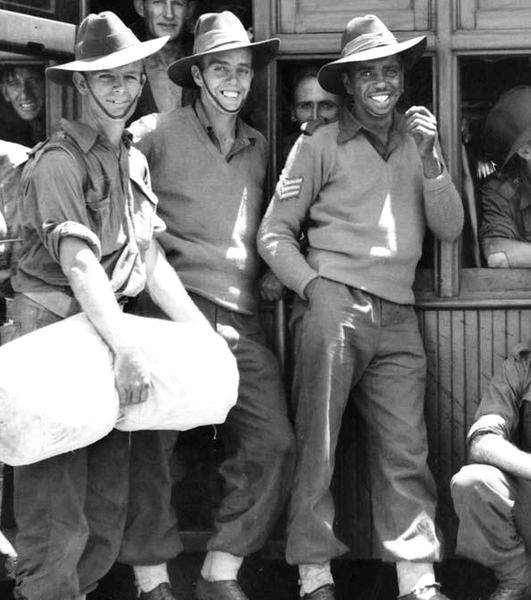
Sergeant Saunders with fellow soldiers of the 2/7th Infantry Battalion in North Queensland, October 1943

Following the outbreak of the Second World War, Saunders was determined to serve in the armed forces. Patriotism and his family's history of soldiering both played a major part in his decision. His father suggested that he wait six months; according to Reg, "They were talking about this war being all over in six months with the Maginot Line and all the other garbage that we were told ... But we waited six months and the duck season was over so there was no more shooting to do except go to war." Saunders enlisted in the Second Australian Imperial Force on 24 April 1940, joining up with friends he had made while playing Australian rules football. The armed forces later adopted a policy to accept only persons "substantially of European origin or descent", but at the time Saunders encountered no barriers to his enlistment. He recalled that his fellow soldiers "were not colour-conscious", and that during training in northern Queensland his white mates would sit alongside him in the "Aboriginal" section of movie theatres. His natural leadership qualities gained him temporary promotions in quick succession: within six weeks of enlistment he was a lance corporal, and after three months he made sergeant.

After completing his training, Saunders was assigned to an infantry unit, the 2/7th Battalion, which was serving overseas in North Africa at the time. Upon reaching the 2/7th, Saunders reverted to the rank of private. His first experience of war came fighting the Italians around Benghazi. In early April 1941, the 6th Division, to which the 2/7th belonged, was sent to Greece to help defend against a German invasion. Following a series of withdrawals, the battalion was evacuated on 26 April, embarking upon the Costa Rica at Kalamata. It was originally bound for Alexandria, but after the ship was attacked in Suda Bay by German aircraft and began to sink, the men of the 2/7th, including Saunders, were picked up by several British destroyers and disembarked on the island of Crete. The 2/7th was subsequently allocated to the island's defending garrison.

Following the invasion of Crete in May 1941, the 2/7th Battalion was initially employed in a coastal defence role, before taking part in the fighting around Canea. After this, it took part in a devastating bayonet charge at the Battle of 42nd Street, along with the New Zealand Maori Battalion, which killed 280 German soldiers according to the website of the Australian War Memorial. The battle at 42nd Street briefly checked the German eastward advance. It was during this battle that Saunders killed his first opponent: "... I saw a German soldier stand up in clear view about thirty yards [30 m] away. He was my first sure kill ... I can remember for a moment that it was just like shooting a kangaroo ... just as remote." As the Allies began to evacuate the island, the 2/7th was called upon to carry out a series of rearguard actions to allow other units to be taken off the island. After the final Allied ships departed the island on 1 June 1941, the battalion was left behind. As a result, many of its men were taken prisoner, though some were able to evade capture by hiding out in the hills and caves around the island. Adopting Cretan dress, learning the dialect, and enlisting the help of local inhabitants, Saunders managed to remain hidden for eleven months.

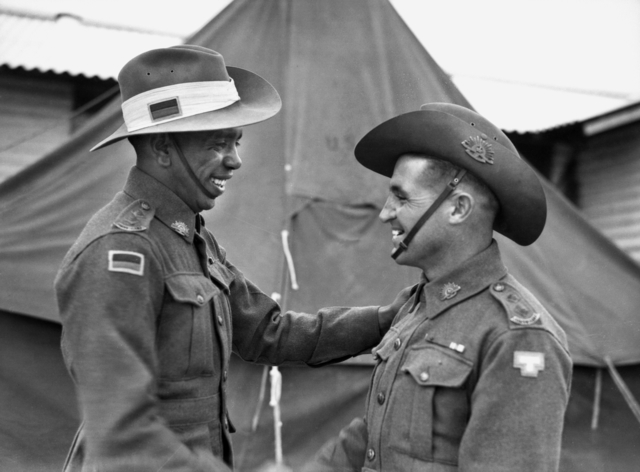
Lieutenants Reg Saunders and Tom Derrick VC congratulate each other on receiving their commissions in November 1944. The two men shared a tent during their officer training.

Saunders was among a party of men evacuated from southern Crete in May 1942, and returned to Australia in October. He rejoined his old unit, the 2/7th Battalion, which had re-formed in Palestine and been brought back to Australia along with the rest of the 6th Division to help defend against the threat posed by Japan's entry into the war. In November 1942, Saunders' younger brother Harry, who had enlisted shortly after him in 1940, was killed in action while serving in New Guinea with the 2/14th Battalion. When Harry had joined up, Reg recalled, "I was angry because I was the only one that was supposed to go. ... with two of us there, one of us was going to get killed ..." The elder Saunders subsequently served in New Guinea as well, fighting in the Salamaua–Lae campaign in mid-1943 where, having again been promoted temporary sergeant, he took over command of a platoon when its commander was wounded in action. For his leadership, he was recommended for a commission by his commanding officer, Lieutenant Colonel Henry Guinn. When Guinn told him of his plan, Saunders laughed and said, "I don't want to be an officer ... I'd rather be Regimental Sergeant Major." Guinn responded, "Christ, they don't make boys RSMs."

Saunders went before an officer selection board that had been set up on the Atherton Tablelands in Queensland, where the units of the 6th Division had been based following their return from New Guinea. The interview panel on the board consisted of three senior officers – all experienced infantry battalion commanders – who were tasked with determining a candidate's suitability for commissioning as an infantry officer. Saunders was found to be an acceptable candidate and posted to an officer training unit in Seymour, Victoria. Upon completion of the 16-week course, he was promoted to lieutenant in November 1944, becoming the first Aboriginal commissioned officer in the Australian Army. The precedent of his commissioning had caused the Army some concern due to its "special significance", and as a result the paperwork for its confirmation was eventually sent to the Commander-in-Chief, General Sir Thomas Blamey, for approval. Blamey is reported to have "insisted upon following the usual procedure", believing that there should be no difference in the way Saunders' commission should be treated to any other soldier who had completed the necessary training. The story garnered much press coverage in Australia, most of it favourable, if in parts paternalistic.

After his promotion was confirmed, Saunders returned to New Guinea and, although it was contrary to policy, rejoined his old battalion. He subsequently took part in the Aitape–Wewak campaign, commanding a platoon until the end of the war. Due to the discriminatory laws in force at the time, Saunders had fewer rights as a citizen than the white Australians he led. He was wounded in the knee by Japanese gunfire during fighting around Maprik, and was hospitalised for three weeks as a result.

== Interbellum and Korean War ==
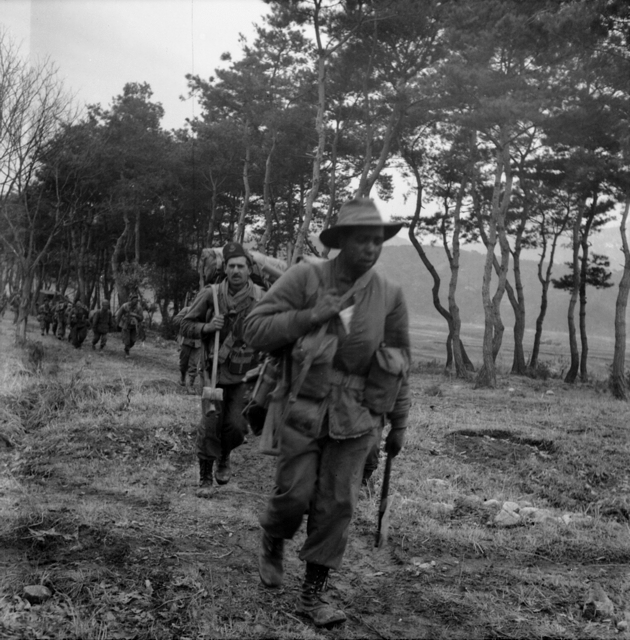
Captain Saunders leading his company in Korea during March 1951

Saunders was discharged from the Army on 5 October 1945, following the end of the Second World War. Returning to Australia, he volunteered for service in Japan with the British Commonwealth Occupation Force, but the government would not accept Aborigines for the operation. Saunders spoke publicly against this policy, calling it "narrow-minded and ignorant"; the wartime restriction on non-European enlistments in the armed forces was not lifted until 1949. Saunders moved to Melbourne with his family, which by this time consisted of his wife Dorothy, whom he had married in 1944, and their three young children. Dorothy had served in the Women's Auxiliary Australian Air Force during the war. Saunders recalled that he "had a hard time after the war ... and poor old Dotty, she, you know, didn't know what the hell to make of it". Facing discrimination that he had rarely encountered as a soldier, he worked in the ensuing years as a tram conductor, a foundry worker, and a shipping clerk.

In August 1950, the government called for Second World War veterans to serve in the Korea War as part of the specially raised 'K' Force. Saunders volunteered and returned to the Army as a lieutenant. After training at Puckapunyal, Victoria, and in Japan, he arrived in Korea in November 1950. He served with the 3rd Battalion, Royal Australian Regiment (3 RAR), initially as a platoon commander in A Company. In February 1951, he took charge of A Company when its commander was wounded; he was subsequently given command of C Company. Promoted to captain, Saunders led C Company during the Battle of Kapyong in April, when 3 RAR and a Canadian battalion held off a Chinese division north-east of the South Korean capital Seoul. Frustrated by the conduct of the war prior to Kapyong, he afterwards recorded that, "At last I felt like an Anzac and I imagine there were 600 others like me." The 3rd Battalion was awarded a US Presidential Unit Citation for its part in the action. Saunders himself was recommended for a decoration but turned it down. Leading a Vickers machine gun platoon at the Battle of Maryang San in October, he reportedly shared the following exchange with a fellow 3 RAR officer: as they surveyed the forbidding mountain before them, Saunders' companion remarked, "No country for white men", to which Saunders replied, "It's no country for black men, either." He returned to Australia in November 1951.

== Later life ==
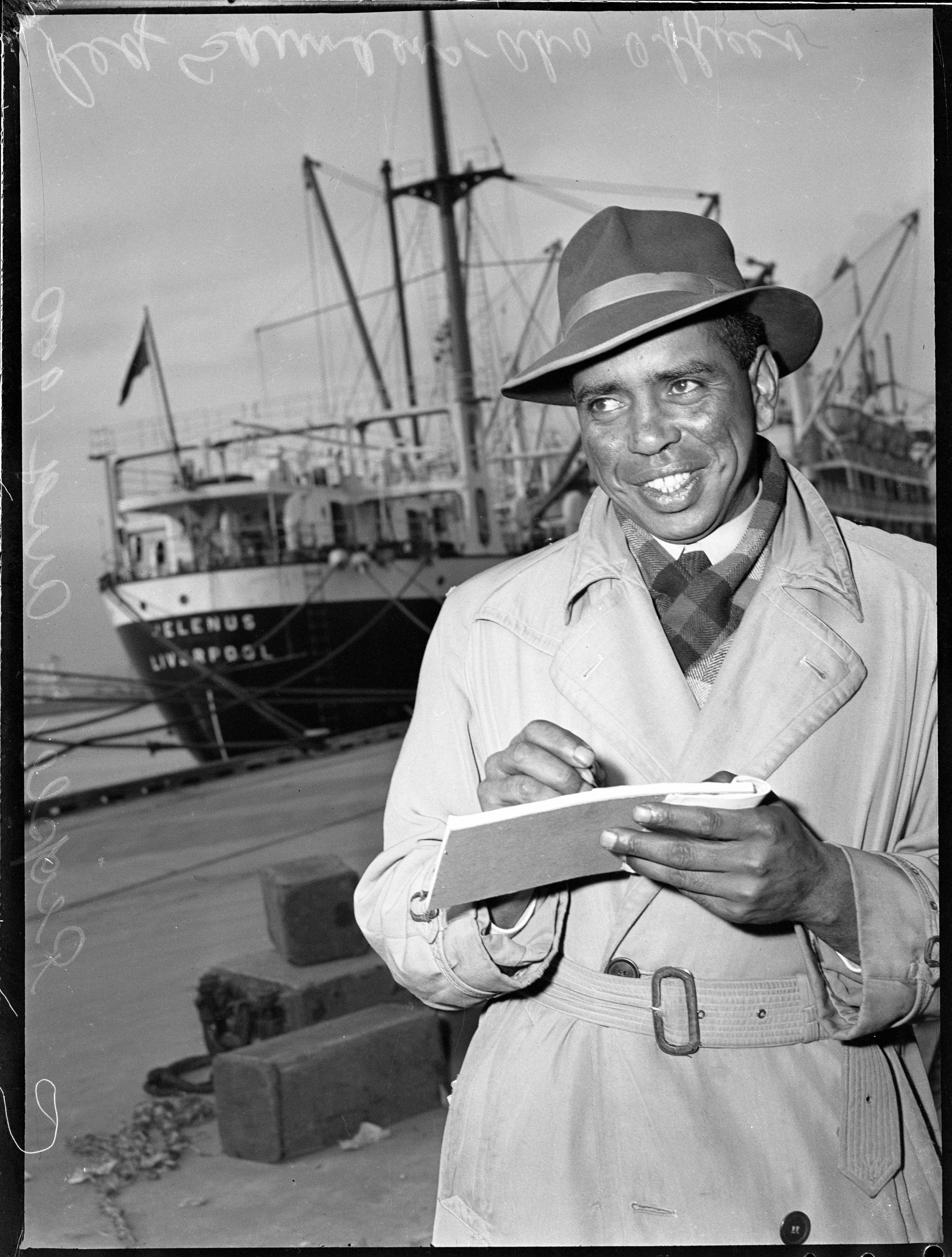
Reginald ‘Reg’ Saunders, Australia, August 1950

In 1953 the Returned and Services League (RSL), a veterans organisation, recommended Saunders for inclusion in the official Australian contingent to the coronation of Elizabeth II; the Federal government rejected the suggestion on the grounds that including Saunders would have meant excluding an officer who had been previously selected. Following his service in the Korean War, Saunders remained in the Army overseeing training for national servicemen at Puckapunyal. Without active service, he soon became dissatisfied and in 1954 was discharged at his own request. The same year, he married an Irish nurse, Pat Montgomery; his first marriage had broken down soon after he returned from Korea.

Saunders went to work in the logging industry in Gippsland, after which he moved to Sydney, where he was employed by the Austral Bronze Company. Seen by many as a role model and spokesman for Aboriginal Australians, in 1969 Saunders took up a position in the Office of Aboriginal Affairs as one of its first liaison officers. Among his tasks was promulgating information on recently legislated Federal funding for Aboriginal and Torres Strait Islander businesses and schooling, following up on recommendations made to government departments, and liaising with Aboriginal welfare groups. He later stated, "I felt a sense of leadership of Aboriginal people and a desire to do something about the Aboriginal situation." His community work was recognised in the Queen's Birthday Honours of June 1971 when he was appointed a Member of the Order of the British Empire (MBE) in the Civil Division. In 1972 he wrote a piece in Identity magazine, urging Aboriginal people to vote in the forthcoming election.

Saunders continued to serve with the Department of Aboriginal Affairs in Canberra until retiring in 1980. In July 1985 he was appointed to the Council of the Australian War Memorial, and held this position until his retirement. He was also involved in the RSL, though he fell out with leaders Alf Garland and Bruce Ruxton over Garland's suggestion that Aborigines be blood-tested to determine their entitlement to government benefits. "They can take all the blood they want from me," Saunders declared in a 1986 interview, "and they'll never find out what I am – least of all an Aborigine – bloody stupid!"

== Personal life, death and legacy ==
During his two marriages, both of which ended in divorce, Saunders fathered ten children, two of whom predeceased him. Having suffered recent heart trouble, he died on 2 March 1990. His ashes were scattered on Lake Condah, traditional territory of the Gunditjmara people.

Of Saunders' children, one of his sons followed him into the Army, and four of his daughters married soldiers.

His son Christopher portrayed him in a 1978 episode of the television series The Sullivans.

Saunders' nephew, James Saunders, wrote a biography of his uncle that includes his family and cultural background, titled Fighting for Country, published in 2026.

== Memorials ==
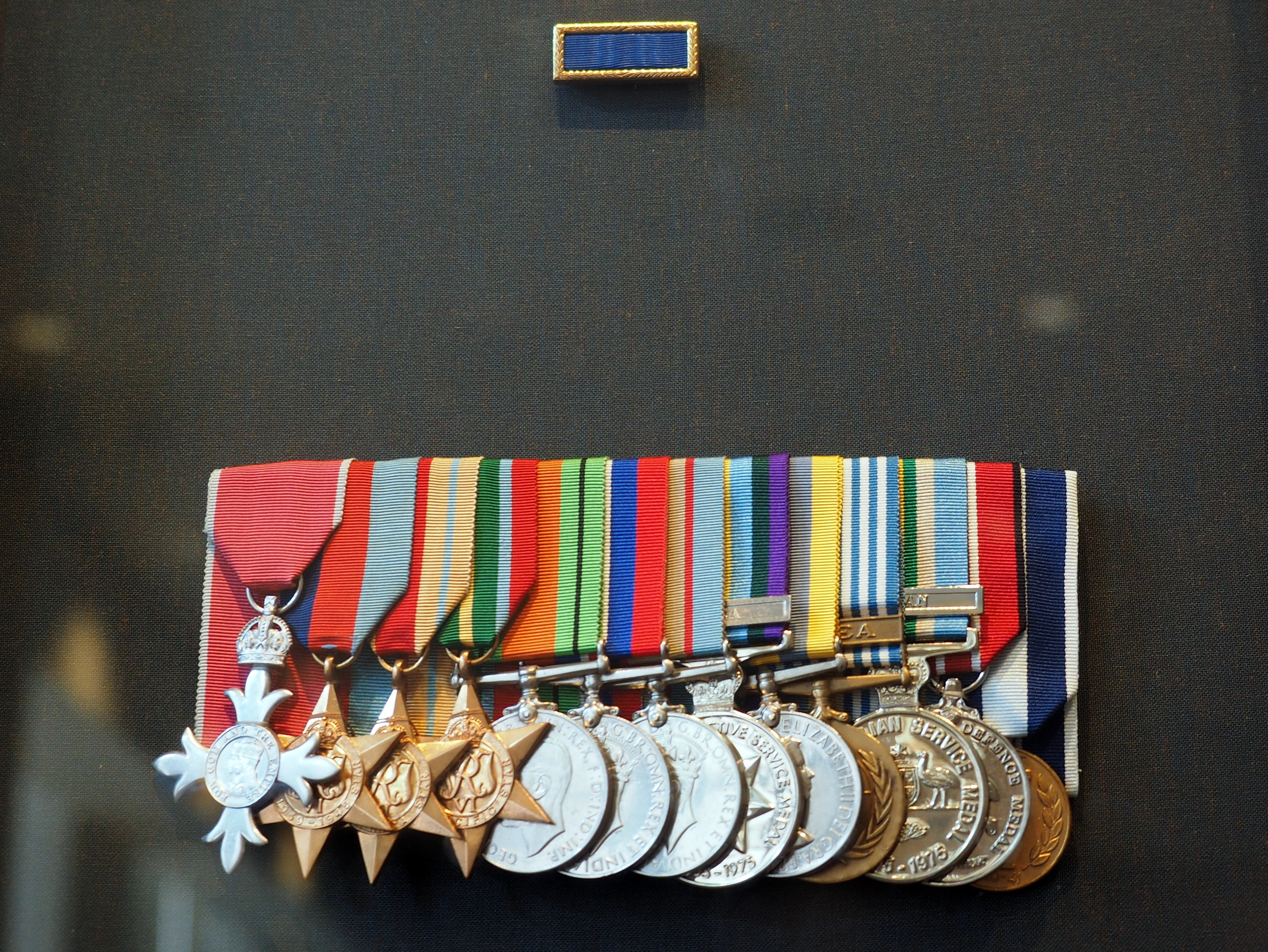
Saunders' medals on display at the Australian War Memorial in 2017

On 14 December 2001, Saunders was honoured with the dedication of Reg Saunders Way, which passes through the Canberra suburbs of Campbell and Russell, in a ceremony attended by the Secretary of the Department of Defence, Dr Allan Hawke, and the Chief of the Defence Force, Admiral Chris Barrie. Saunders was also commemorated with a room in the Canberra Services Club, and by the RSL's Captain Reg Saunders Scholarship.

The Australian War Memorial holds Saunders' medals and several personal effects in its national collection, along with an official portrait and several photographs. On 11 November 2015 the Australian War Memorial's Western Gallery and Courtyard were renamed in Saunders' honour. These were the first sections of the Memorial to be named after any Australian.
