= John Rawlins =

John Rawlins may refer to:

- John Aaron Rawlins (1831–1869), United States Army general during the American Civil War
  - General John A. Rawlins, an 1874 public statue of Rawlins, in Washington, D.C.
- John Rawlins (director) (1902–1997), American film director
- John Rawlins (Royal Navy officer) (1922–2011), Royal Navy Medical officer and pioneer in diving medicine
- John Rawlins (MP) (by 1493–1532), for Gloucester
- John Rawlins (rugby union) (born 1957), Welsh rugby union player
