= John Rawlings =

John Rawlings may refer to:

- John Rawlings (photographer) (1912–1970), American fashion photographer
- John Joseph Rawlings (1860–1942), British engineer and inventor of the wall plug
- John Rawlings (priest) (born 1947), Anglican priest
- Johnny Rawlings (1892–1972), Major League Baseball player
- Jack Rawlings (1923–2016), English footballer

== See also ==
- John Rawling, British sports commentator
- Jerry Rawlings (Jerry John Rawlings), president of Ghana
- John Rawlins (disambiguation)
