= William Rawlings =

William Rawlings may refer to:

- Bill Rawlings (1896–1972), English footballer
- William Henley Rawlings (1848–1906), English-born Australian politician
- William Reginald Rawlings (1892–1918), Australian army officer
- William V. Rawlings (1913–1975), American politician from Virginia
