= Rawlings =

Rawlings may refer to:

- Rawlings (company), a U.S. sports equipment company
- Rawlings, Maryland, an unincorporated community in Allegany County, Maryland
- Rawlings, Virginia, an unincorporated community in Brunswick County, Virginia
- Rawlings (surname), including a list of people with the name

== See also ==
- Rawlins (disambiguation)
