= William S. Hillyer =

American Civil War general

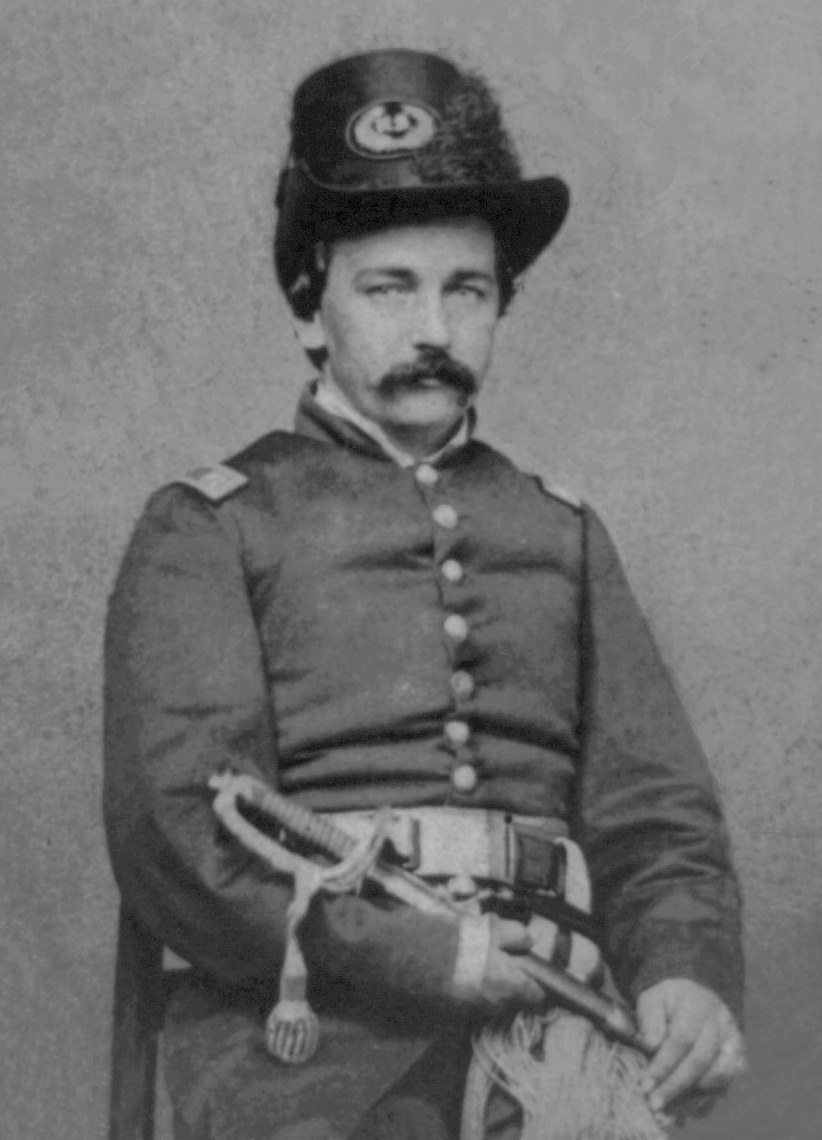
- Hillyer in 1861, in Colonel's uniform
- Born: William Sillman Hillyer; April 2, 1830; Henderson, Kentucky, U.S.
- Died: July 12, 1874 (aged 43 or 44); Washington D.C., U.S.
- Burial place: Mount Pleasant Cemetery, Newark, Essex County, New Jersey, US
- Spouse: Anna Rankin
- Children: Six
- Military career
- Allegiance: United States
- Branch: Union Army
- Service years: 1861–1865
- Rank: Colonel; Bvt. Brigadier General
- Commands: Provost Marshal General of the Dept. of the Tennessee
- Conflicts: American Civil War; Battle of Fort Donelson; Battle of Vicksburg; Battle of Shiloh; Battle of Appomattox

William Sillman Hillyer (Note: Last name has also been spelled as Hilyer by contemporaries such as William T. Sherman.) (April 2, 1830 – July 12, 1874) was an American lawyer and Union officer who advanced through the ranks to Brevet Brigadier General during the American Civil War. Before the war he practiced law in Saint Louis where he met Ulysses S. Grant. During most of the Civil War he served under General Grant and was with him at the Battle of Fort Donelson, Battle of Shiloh and the Siege of Vicksburg. Hillyer was chosen by General Grant to be a member of his staff, and was one of its original members and the last surviving member of the original staff. After the war he served as a Treasury agent under presidents Johnson and Grant. He later pursued a political career in New York but was unsuccessful due to opposition from various political rivals.

== Early life ==
Hillyer was born in Henderson, Kentucky, the son of James and Catherine, his second wife. Hillyer's father was the postmaster of Henderson, Kentucky; his mother was a niece of Benjamin Silliman, a noted scientist and an educator at Yale University. Hillyer lost both his parents when he was a youth, and along with his older sister Elizabeth, went to live with their aunt Mary Lapsley in New Albany, Indiana. In 1847 he graduated from Anderson University in Indiana. Hillyer studied at Yale University in 1848 and 1849. He studied law at Indiana State University in 1850 and was admitted to the Indiana bar in 1851. Hillyer practiced law in New Albany, where he served as the city attorney. From January 4, 1855, to March 5, 1855, Hillyer served in the Indiana House of Representatives. Hillyer married Anna Rankin of Newark—together they had six children which include twin sons whom he named after Generals Grant and Rawlins.

The Hillyer papers include correspondence from 1848 to 1874 and are archived at the University of Virginia. The papers mostly lend themselves to Hillyer's Civil War service. He often wrote to his wife concerning personal matters and other activities, with other correspondence to his friends and acquaintances and to a number of military personnel including Ulysses S. Grant. The Hillyer and Grant families were close friends: Hillyer and Grant corresponded occasionally while their wives corresponded often. The Hillyer papers also include various military documents, several of Hillyer's speeches, photographs of Hillyer with his family a scrapbook of newspaper and other clippings, and an assortment of miscellaneous items relating to the Civil War.

== Missouri ==
In 1855 Hillyer moved to St. Louis, Missouri, and together formed the law firm of McClellan, Hillyer and Moody (Note: i.e. William S. Hillyer, James G. McClellan and James C. Moody) During this time he met Ulysses S. Grant, who was renting office quarters from the firm. Hillyer also gave support to Grant's efforts to win the appointment of St. Louis County engineer. He was employed as a real estate agent renting office space from Grant and Harry Boggs. The two men shared office space and often discussed the issues that would eventually led to the Civil War. He also practiced law in St. Louis.

== Military life ==
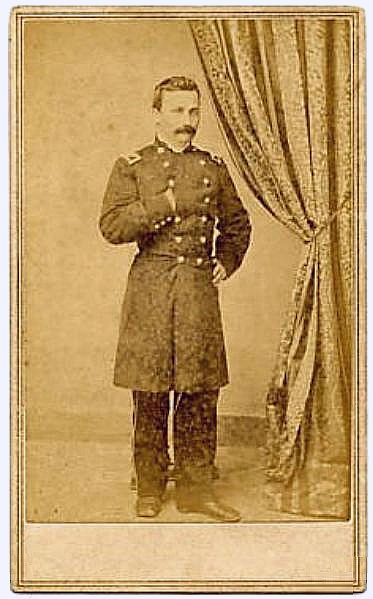
Hillyer in colonel's uniform

In 1861 Hillyer served as a private in the Union army and was present during the capture of Camp Jackson in Missouri on May 10. Thereafter he moved to New York, where he practiced law. Soon after Ulysses Grant was commissioned as brigadier-general and in August 1861 he offered Hillyer from his former regiment a place on his staff, with the rank of captain. In a letter to his wife, Grant said of Hillyer that he was one of the "cleverest men...anywhere". On October 4, while stationed in Cairo, Illinois, Rawlins by Special Order, appointed Hillyer as the Mustering Officer for the district in compliance to Lincoln's calls for volunteers.

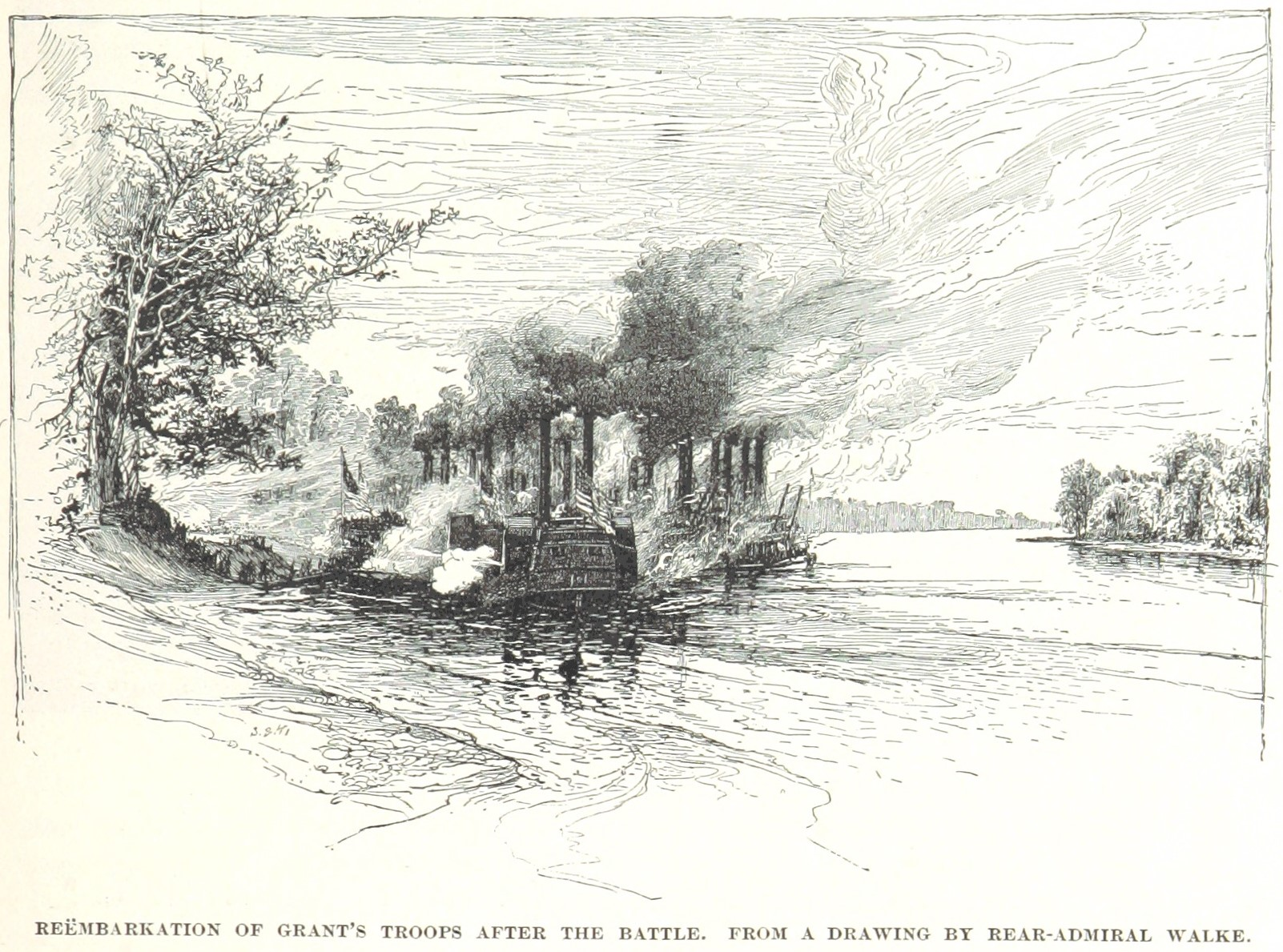
Grant's troops withdraw from the Battle of Belmont

At the Battle of Belmont on November 7, 1861, when Grant's horse was shot from under him, Hillyer offered Grant his mount and Grant continued to lead. During the retreat to the transports on the river after the battle, Grant had been searching for one of his regiments that was missing, but with the Confederates advancing, Grant sped to the landing and found that the boats' captains had already cast off the mooring lines. Grant wrote in his memoirs:

"The captain of the boat that had just pushed out recognized me and ordered the engineer not to start the engine: he then had a plank run out for me. My horse seemed to take in the situation. He put his fore feet over the bank without hesitation or urging, and, with his hind feet well under him, slid down the bank and trotted on board."

In February, 1862, while a colonel on General Grant's staff on the final day of the siege of Fort Donelson, Hillyer took dictation from Grant and penned Grant's famous words, "No terms except an unconditional and immediate surrender can be accepted. I propose to move immediately on your works." The entire dispatch was written and carried by Hillyer who delivered it in person to Confederate General Buckner, commander of the fort. After the battle Colonel Hillyer and Brigadier General Lew Wallace had a falling out over Wallace's report on the battle, which did not mention that Hillyer and Grant's other aides were seen on the battlefield by Wallace or any of his aides, although Hillyer claimed otherwise. Hillyer later criticized Wallace, claiming his report exaggerated the contributions of Wallace and his division, and accused him of cowardice. Wallace, however, was later exonerated of any such cowardice. In his report of the battle Hillyer and other aides were mentioned by General Grant for their gallantry and services during the battle.

In April 1862 Governor Hamilton Gamble of Missouri appointed Hillyer as aide-de-camp with a promotion to the rank of Colonel of Volunteers on May 3, 1862. In May, Hillyer was appointed assistant aide-de-camp on the staff of Major General Henry W. Halleck. Hillyer was again appointed Provost Marshal General of the Department of the Tennessee on June 24 having jurisdiction over various sections in Mississippi, Tennessee and Kentucky.

Serving under General Grant as one of his aides before the Battle of Shiloh, Hillyer was dispatched to St. Louis by the General to beseech General Halleck for permission for Grant to attack Johnson's army at Corinth before they were organized. Days later, Hillyer returned to Grant with disappointing news that Grant's appeal to Halleck had flatly been turned down. On the first day of the battle Hillyer had witnessed many green Union troops fleeing, where he later recorded: "We met hundreds of cowardly renegades fleeing to the river and reporting their regiments cut to pieces. We tried in vain to rally and return them to the front". Hillyer left the battlefield to bring Grant's several regiments from Savannah back to Pittsburg Landing, where they were desperately needed. When General Grant was criticized by the press for the high casualties at Shiloh, Hillyer, in a letter to Grant's father, defended the general, maintaining that this was a falsehood spread by the fleeing green troops. Hillyer's letter, along with a letter from Grant to Hillyer, was published in the Cincinnati Commercial soon after. Later Hillyer served under Grant during the Tennessee and Vicksburg campaigns.

On May 15, 1863, Hillyer resigned because of failing health and returned to New York. In March, 1865 he was brevetted brigadier general and in June served as the chairman of the Grand Reunion of the Army of the Tennessee. After the close of the war he was appointed a revenue-agent by President Grant. Later he was nominated as general appraiser in the custom-house in 1874, but his name was withdrawn after much opposition. After Rawlins' premature death, Hillyer and several others claimed that it was Rawlins' military insights that were responsible for winning the war. Hillyer was the last surviving member of General Grant's original staff. (Note: Other original staff members include Colonel Theodore Bowers, and John Rawlins)

== Political life ==
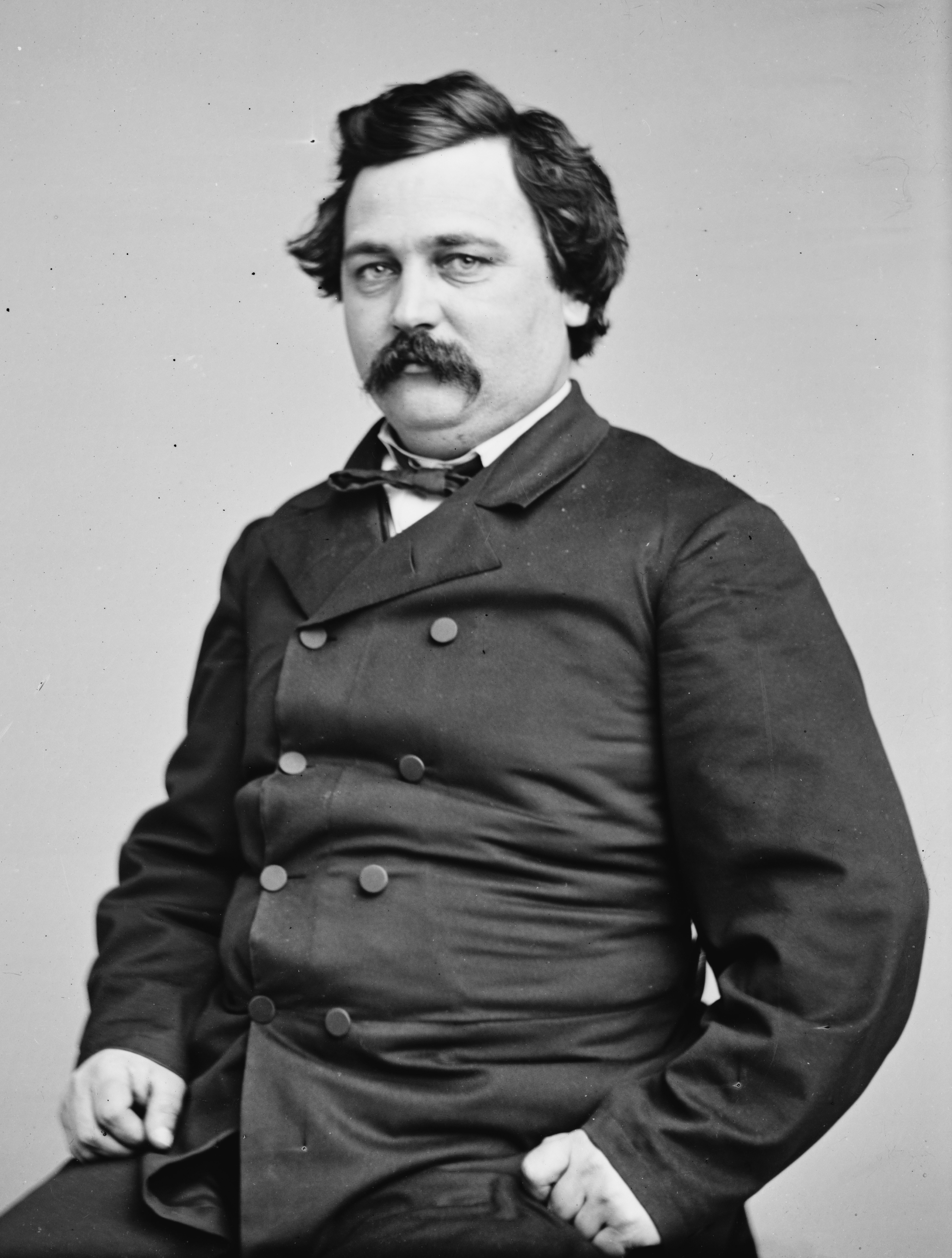
William Hillyer in later years

In 1868 Hillyer was appointed a U.S. revenue agent by President Andrew Johnson until the position was abolished by Congress, after which he served as a lawyer for the Commissioners of Immigration. Hillyer was nominated in 1871 as a candidate for president of the New York Board of Commissioners, for general appraiser of cargo and goods at the New York Customs House, and for naval officer, but Senator Roscoe Conkling opposed his nomination.

== Death ==
In 1874 Hillyer died at age 43 in Washington, D.C., from lung congestion. While he was bedridden at the Owen House during the last three weeks of his life President Grant was a daily visitor at his bedside.

== See also ==
- List of American Civil War brevet generals (Union)
- List of American Civil War generals (Union)
- List of American Civil War battles

== Bibliography ==
- Boatner, Mark M. III (1988). The Civil War Dictionary (Revised ed.). New York: David McKay. ISBN 978-0-8129-1726-0.
- Chernow, Ron (2017). Grant. New York: Penguin Press. ISBN 978-1-59420-487-6. (pp. 105, 148, 180, 201, 222, 534–535)
- Hillyer, William S. (1869). An address delivered by Gen'l William S. Hillyer. New York, N.Y. : Douglas Taylor.
- Hurst, Jack (2012). Born to Battle: Grant and Forrest--Shiloh, Vicksburg, and Chattanooga. Basic Books. ISBN 978-0-4650-2018-8.
- Howland, Edward (1868). Grant as a soldier and Statesmen. J. B. Burr & Co.
- McFeely, William S. (1981). Grant: A Biography. New York • London: W. W. Norton & Company. ISBN 0-393-01372-3.
- Sherman, William Tecumseh (1890). Personal memoirs of Gen. W.T. Sherman. New York: Charles L. Webster & Co.
- Small, Albert and Shirley (2009). "A guide to the Papers of General William S. Hillyer". University of Virginia Library.
- Grant, Ulysses S. (1967) [1861]. Simon, John Y. (ed.). The Papers of Ulysses S. Grant, Vol.1;. Southern Illinois University Press.
- Grant, Ulysses S. (1967) [1861]. Simon, John Y. (ed.). The Papers of Ulysses S. Grant, Vol.2; September 21, 1861;. Carbondale, Southern Illinois University Press. ISBN 9780809304714.
- Stephens, Gail (2010). Shadow of Shiloh: Major General Lew Wallace in the Civil War. Indiana Historical Society. ISBN 978-0-8719-5287-5.
- "Death of General William S. Hillyer". The Pittsburgh Daily Commercial. Pittsburgh, Pennsylvania. July 13, 1874.
- "Obituary: General William S. Hillyer". The New York Daily Herald. Pittsburgh, Pennsylvania. July 14, 1874.
