= John Aaron Rawlins =

Union Army general and 29th Secretary of War (1831–1869)

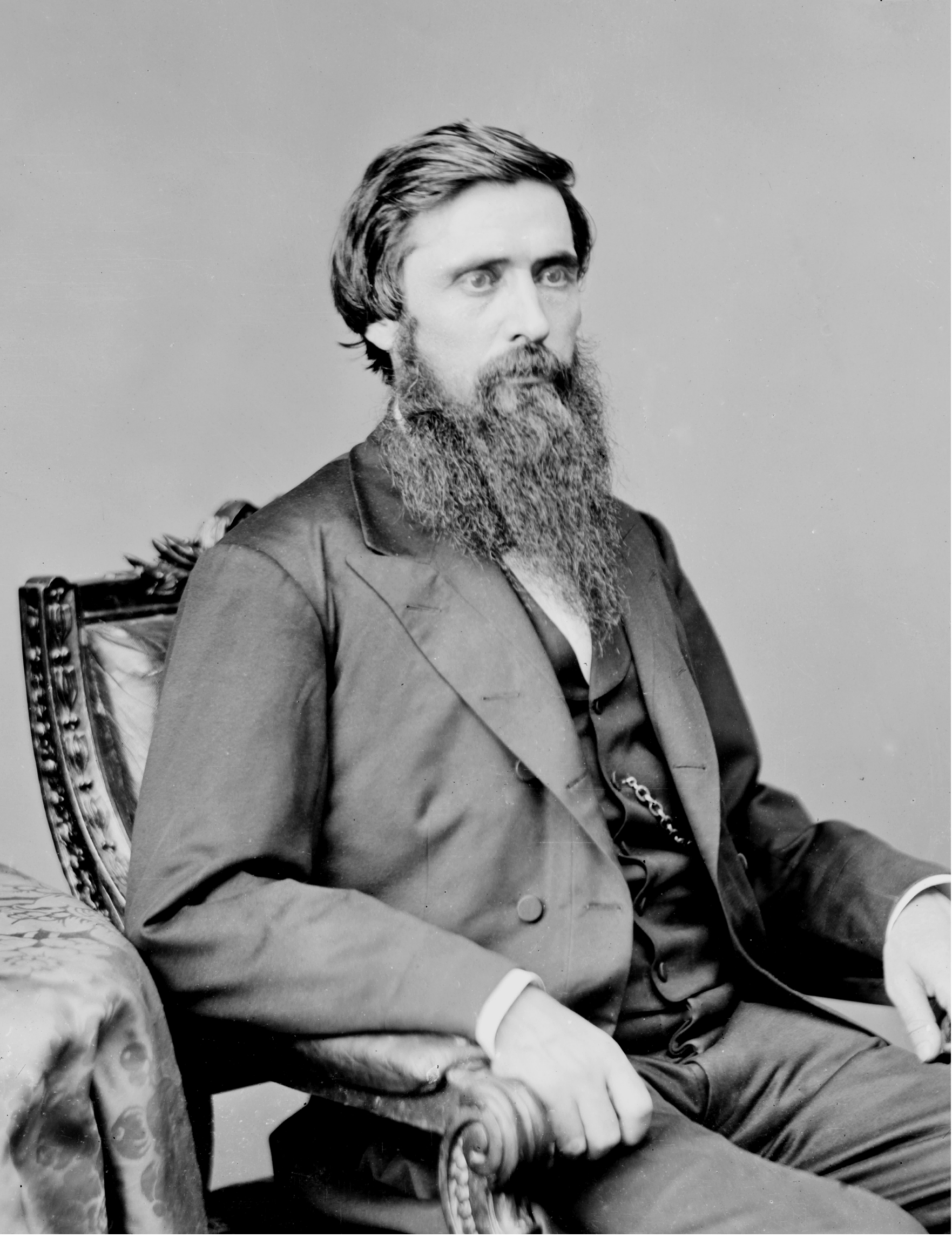
- Rawlins, 1860–1869

29th United States Secretary of War
- In office March 13, 1869 – September 6, 1869
- President: Ulysses S. Grant
- Preceded by: John Schofield
- Succeeded by: William Tecumseh Sherman (acting)

Personal details
- Born: John Aaron Rawlins; February 13, 1831 Galena, Illinois, U.S.
- Died: September 6, 1869 (aged 38) Washington, D.C., U.S.
- Resting place: Arlington National Cemetery
- Party: Democratic (Before 1868); Republican (1868–1869)
- Spouse(s): Emily Smith (m. 1855; died 1861) Mary Emma Hurlburt (m. 1863)
- Children: 6
- Nickname: "Charcoal Boy"

Military service
- Allegiance: United States
- Branch/service: United States Army • Union Army
- Years of service: 1861–1869
- Rank: Major General
- Battles/wars: American Civil War

John Aaron Rawlins (February 13, 1831 – September 6, 1869) was a general officer in the Union army during the American Civil War and a cabinet officer in the Grant administration. A longtime confidant of Ulysses S. Grant, Rawlins served on Grant's staff throughout the war, rising to the rank of brevet major general, and was Grant's chief defender against allegations of insobriety. He was appointed Secretary of War when Grant was elected President of the United States.

Rawlins was a self-made man who overcame an impoverished family background, scanty education, and an absentee father who was prone to drink. After studying law, Rawlins passed the bar in 1854 and started a practice in Galena, Illinois. He was a Douglas Democrat at the outbreak of the Civil War; a noted public speaker, he gave a notable pro-Union speech at the start of hostilities, and he soon became close friends with Ulysses S. Grant, a Galena resident, United States Military Academy graduate, and Mexican–American War veteran who had served in the Army for 11 years. Rawlins persuaded Grant to drill and muster a local volunteer militia company and send them to the state capital in Springfield so they could be inducted into federal service. After brief service in the Illinois militia as a mustering officer, Grant was soon recommissioned in the Army to serve under Union General John C. Frémont, commander of Union army forces in the western United States. Rawlins also joined the Union Army and served primarily as an officer on Grant's staff; his promotions were linked to Grant's success on the battlefields and Grant's advancement in the Union Army under President Abraham Lincoln. Rawlins contracted tuberculosis in 1863, but continued to serve on Grant's staff during Reconstruction.

After Grant won the 1868 election and assumed the presidency in March 1869, he named Rawlins as his Secretary of War. With the exception perhaps of his approving the height of the Brooklyn Bridge, before construction, Rawlins' brief tenure saw several controversies. Rawlins supported insurrection against Spanish rule in Cuba, established an anti-Mormon policy for the Utah Territory, and reduced the authority of General William Tecumseh Sherman, Grant's successor as commander of the Army. Rawlins' tuberculosis continued to worsen, and he died in September 1869, five months into his term. Except for a 1916 biography, The Life of John A. Rawlins, by James Harrison Wilson, Rawlins' short life is not well known, while Grant, perhaps protecting his own reputation, rarely mentioned him in his popular Memoirs, published in 1885. With Rawlins' death, strong cabinet-level support for an independent Cuba ended, and did not become a priority until the Spanish–American War in 1898.

== Early life and career ==
John Aaron Rawlins was born on February 13, 1831, in East Galena, Illinois, the second of ten children born to James Dawson and Lovisa Collier Rawlins, both of Scotch-Irish descent, whose ancestors originally settled in Culpeper County, Virginia. James Rawlins was a descendant of Robert Rawlins, who originally settled in Maryland, and he became a farmer and charcoal maker in Missouri and Illinois.

In 1849, James Rawlins migrated to California during the Gold Rush, and he stayed for three years. While his father was absent, Rawlins became the primary caretaker of his mother, sister, and six brothers. James did not strike gold, and upon returning home, he halfheartedly devoted his time to his family farm and timber lands, while John Rawlins took on increasing responsibility as the head of the family. Rawlins blamed his father James' carefree lifestyle and lack of attention to his family on strong drinks. His father's behavior affected Rawlins' own attitudes and fears concerning alcohol, and he became a teetotaler. According to historian Bruce Catton, Rawlins' abstention was caused by his belief that if he took even one drink, he would not be able to stop.

Rawlins' early education was scanty; he attended local schools in Illinois and spent a year and a half at Rock River Seminary in Mount Morris, Illinois. Rawlins attracted notice locally as a "self-made man" by going through a period of self-directed study to make up for his lack of formal education. He then studied law in the office of Isaac P. Stevens of Galena and attained admission to the bar in 1854. Rawlins practiced in partnership with Stevens, and later with David Sheean, who had studied under Rawlins.

== Election of 1860 ==
Politically Rawlins aligned himself with the Democratic Party and supported the presidential campaign of Stephen A. Douglas during the Presidential election of 1860. Rawlins was elected as Douglas's elector for the first Congressional district of Illinois. Rawlins began a series of debates with the Republican elector candidate Allen C. Fuller. Party feelings ran high over the issues of the spread of slavery and loyalty to the Union. Douglas, like Abraham Lincoln, the Republican presidential candidate, opposed the spread of slavery, while not disturbing the institution where slavery already existed. The pro-slavery Democrats advocated that slavery should spread throughout territories south of the old line in the Missouri Compromise. Douglas followed the compromise "Popular Sovereignty" platform. Lincoln was elected President and Rawlins returned to his law practice in Galena. Rawlins rightly feared there would be a violent civil war.

== Marriages, family, health ==
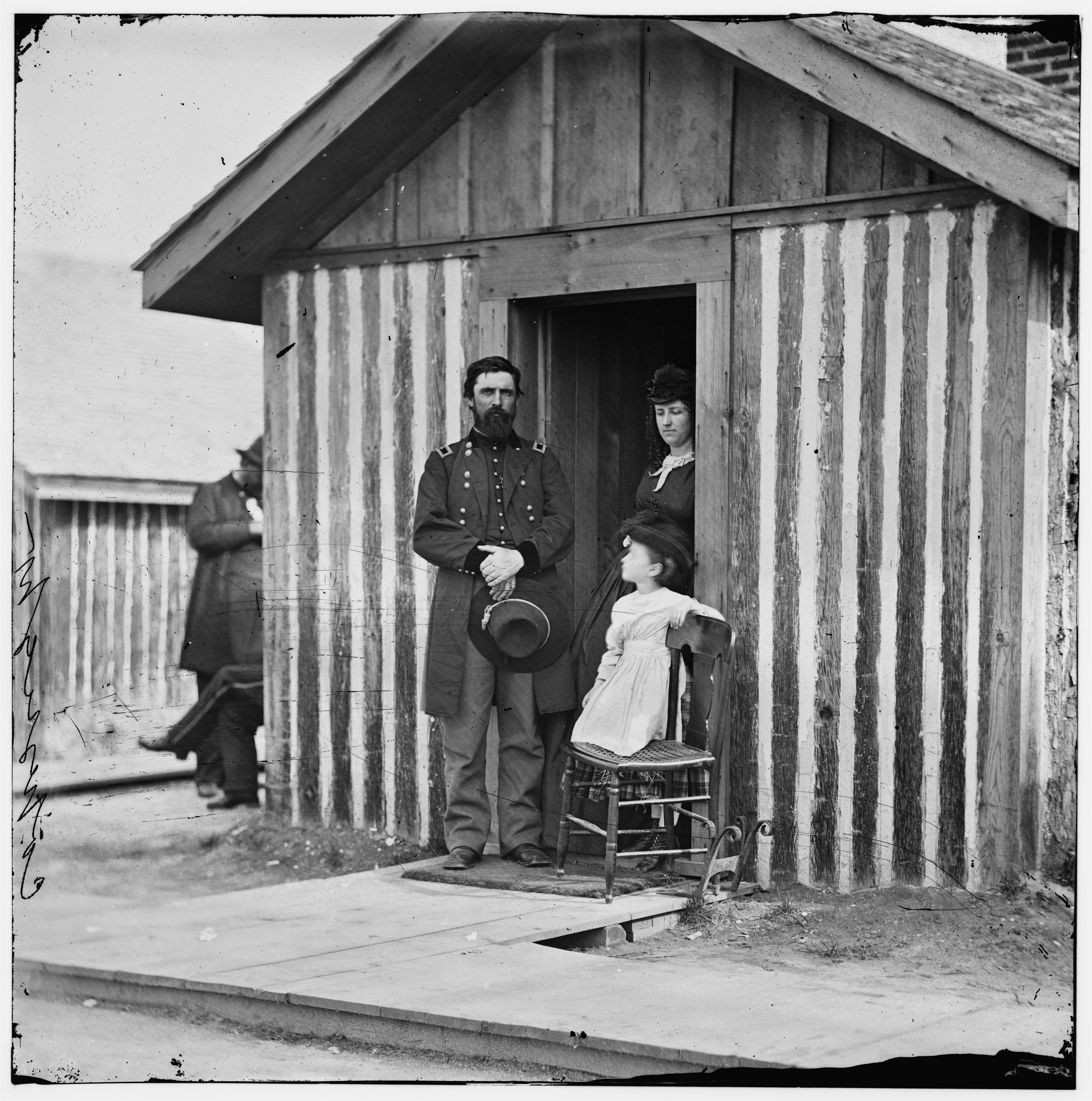
General Rawlins at his quarters in City Point, Virginia, with his second wife, Mary Hurlburt, and his child

On June 5, 1856, Rawlins married Emily Smith, daughter of Hiram Smith of Goshen, New York. Their marriage produced three children including son James, and daughters Jennie and Emily. Mrs. Rawlins died of tuberculosis in August 1861, shortly after Rawlins began his service with the Union Army. According to historian Bruce Catton, her death left Rawlins with the fear he would one day die of the same disease. On December 23, 1863, Rawlins married Mary Emma Hurlburt, the daughter of S. A. Hurlburt of Danbury, Connecticut. During the Winter of 1863 Rawlins developed a persistent cough that was later diagnosed as tuberculosis.

== American Civil War ==
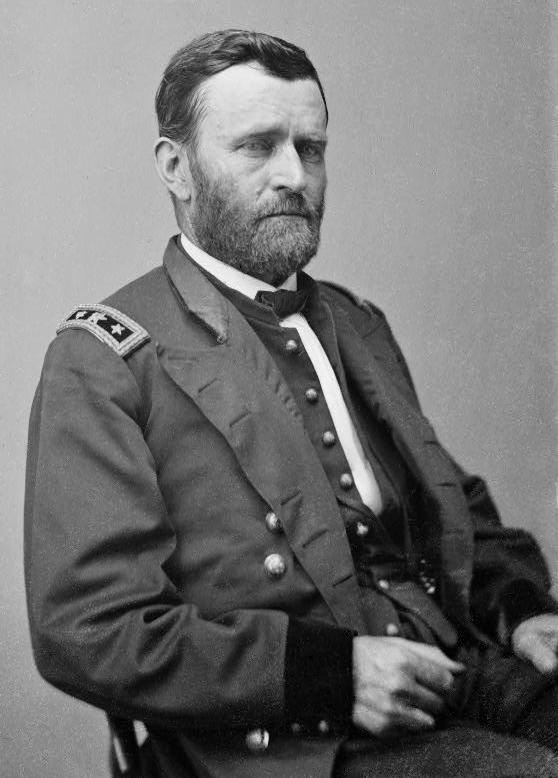
General Ulysses S. Grant

=== Galena Union loyalty speech ===
After Fort Sumter fell, at the outbreak of the American Civil War, Galena's residents held a town meeting; the featured speakers were U.S. Congressman Elihu B. Washburne and Rawlins. Rawlins made his pro-Union sentiments clear when he stated: "I have been a Democrat all my life; but this is no longer a question of politics; It is simply country or no country; I have favored every honorable compromise; but the day for compromise is passed; only one course is left us. We will stand by the flag of our country, and appeal to the god of battles."

=== Union Army military promotions ===
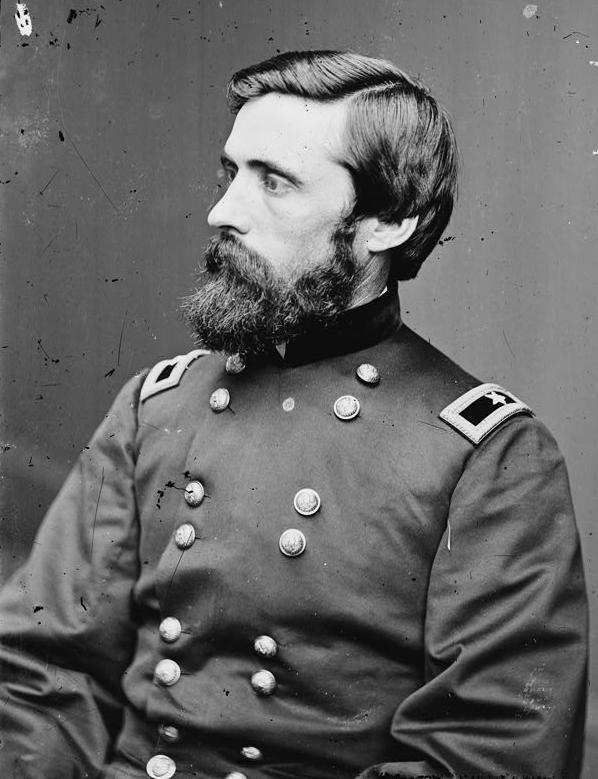
General John A. Rawlins

In 1861, Rawlins took an active role in the organization of the 45th Illinois Infantry, in response to President Abraham Lincoln's call for 75,000 volunteers, and Grant volunteered to help train the regiment. Grant was soon appointed commander of the 21st Illinois Volunteer Infantry Regiment, and requested that Rawlins become his aide-de-camp. Rawlins accepted and on August 30 he was appointed a captain in the regular Army and Assistant Adjutant-General of Volunteers. On September 14, Rawlins reported to Grant's headquarters in Cairo. From this time forward, Rawlins remained by Grant's side and became Grant's most influential staff officer, advisor, and closest friend. Like most men at the beginning of the Civil War, Rawlins was not formally military trained, however, he was naturally suited for his position. As Grant rose in rank and responsibility, Rawlins was likewise promoted in roles of increasing responsibility and rank, including Chief of Staff of the Army of the Tennessee and Chief of Staff of the Military Division of the Mississippi. He was known for his great attention to detail, as well as being a stickler for proper protocol. On May 14, 1862, Rawlins was promoted to major, and on November 1 he was promoted to lieutenant colonel. Just before joining his staff, he exacted a pledge from Grant, who had a history of alcohol problems, not to drink during the war. He forbade the use of alcohol at headquarters and a year after joining the staff signed a pledge himself not to consume alcohol. During the war, Rawlins frequently scolded Grant for perceived derelictions with an impunity that often surprised onlookers.

Rawlins was promoted to brigadier general of Volunteers on August 11, 1863. When Grant was promoted to general in chief of all the Union armies, Rawlins became Chief of Staff of the General Headquarters of the United States Army. He was promoted to brevet major general on February 24, 1865, to brigadier general in the regular army on March 3, and brevet major general in the regular army on April 9.

=== Petitioned for Sheean release (1862) ===
In the fall of 1862, Rawlins' law partner David Sheean, an outspoken critic of Lincoln's war policy, was arrested; he was an outspoken Democrat, and because habeas corpus had been suspended by President Abraham Lincoln in 1861, Sheean's Republican political enemies worked to have him detained without charges at Fort Lafayette, New York. Rawlins took a leave of absence to aid Sheean, and petitioned in person to both Secretary of War Edwin M. Stanton and Congressman Elihu B. Washburne. Sheean was finally released in December, 1862.

=== Objected to General Order No. 11 (1862) ===
During the Vicksburg Campaign, on December 17, 1862, Grant issued General Order No. 11 expelling Jews, as a class, from Grant's military district. Grant had identified an illegal cotton trade network that he believed funded the Confederate Army. Grant blamed Jewish traders for breaking Treasury Department regulations. Jewish persons who did not obey the order were to be arrested and forcibly removed as prisoners. Rawlins, Grant's attorney and Asst. Adjt. Gen., strongly warned Grant not to issue the order. Grant refused to take Rawlins' advice concerning the order and told him: "Well, they can countermand this from Washington if they like, but we will issue it anyhow." The controversial order was revoked by President Abraham Lincoln.

=== Grant's Washington, D.C., emissary (1863) ===
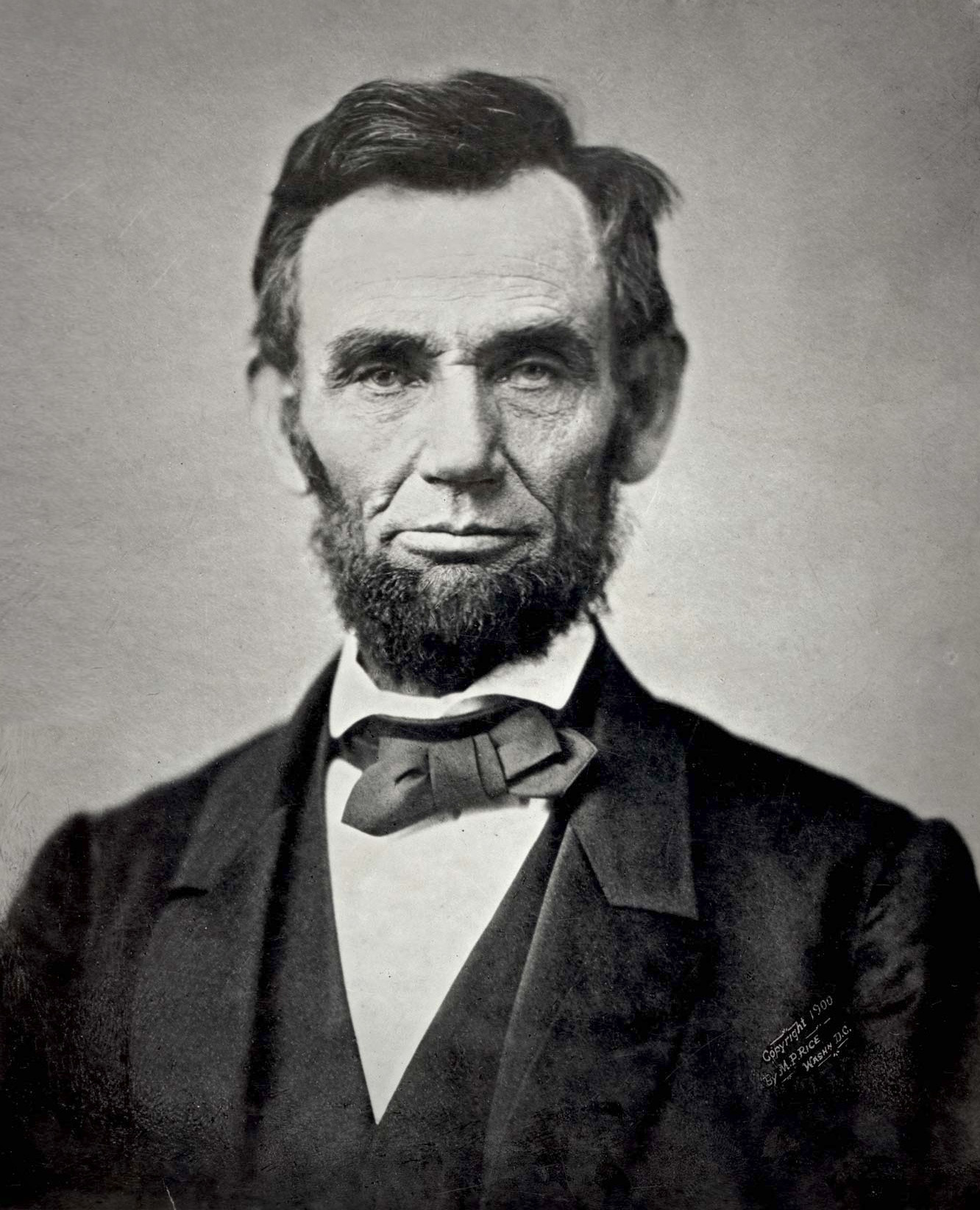
In July 1863 Rawlins met with President Abraham Lincoln and his Cabinet at the White House.

During the Summer of 1863, Grant sent Rawlins east to Washington, D.C., as his emissary. At this time Grant was relatively unknown in political circles, having fought far from Washington, D.C., in the Western Theater. Rawlins arrived in Washington, D.C., on July 30 and talked with General-In-Chief Henry W. Halleck at the War Department and the Army's assistant adjutant general, Colonel J.C. Kelton. Halleck cordially received Rawlins and told Rawlins he was pleased with Grant's victory and endorsed Grant's Vicksburg surrender terms, including releasing 31,000 Confederate prisoners on parole. Rawlins then went to the White House and met President Abraham Lincoln and his Cabinet. He handed Lincoln a letter from Grant that asked for Rawlins to be given an interview with Lincoln so Rawlins could brief him on the successful results of the Vicksburg Campaign and explain why the Confederate soldiers were paroled. Special observer Charles A. Dana and Secretary of Navy Gideon Welles gave Rawlins high praise for his industrious nature and his intelligence. Dana stated that Rawlins was a "very industrious, conscientious man." Welles stated that he was pleased by Rawlins' "frank, intelligent, and interesting description of men and of army operations."

=== Chattanooga letter to Grant (1863) ===
During the Chattanooga campaign in November 1863, Grant was alleged to have been drinking excessively among other generals and subordinates who had access to bottles of whiskey and a bottle of wine received from Grant's mother Hannah. Rawlins heard of this, and considering himself to be Grant's protector when it came to alcohol, wrote him a letter on November 15 or 16, which was never sent; it demanded that Grant "immediately desist from further tasting of liquors of any kind". Rawlins' concerns were unfounded; According to General David Hunter, who had the opportunity to observe Grant closely during this period, Grant had only two drinks in three weeks during the month of November. On November 14, Grant had actually broken up a drinking party between his subordinate Colonel Clark Lagow and Lagow's friends at four in the morning. Rawlins kept this unsent letter in his records, where it was later found by historians. This unsent letter was one of several items which created the impression that Grant routinely drank to excess.

== Dodge expedition and attempted health recovery (1867) ==
In 1867, during Reconstruction, Rawlins accompanied the military escort that traveled with Grenville M. Dodge's expedition to explore the proposed route of the Union Pacific Railroad. Dodge was chief engineer for the Union Pacific, which was responsible for building the railroad from east to west, while the Central Pacific Railroad built from west to east. Rawlins had accompanied Dodge as far as Salt Lake City, Utah, in hopes that the dry air of the plains would help cure his tuberculosis. Dodge later named one of the expedition's Wyoming campsites Rawlins; this site was later incorporated as a town. After four months of travel with Dodge, Rawlins returned to Washington, D.C., but his health had not substantially improved. (Note: During Rawlins' lifetime, there were no effective treatments for tuberculosis (TB), the most widespread public concern in the 19th and early 20th centuries.)

== Secretary of War (1869) ==
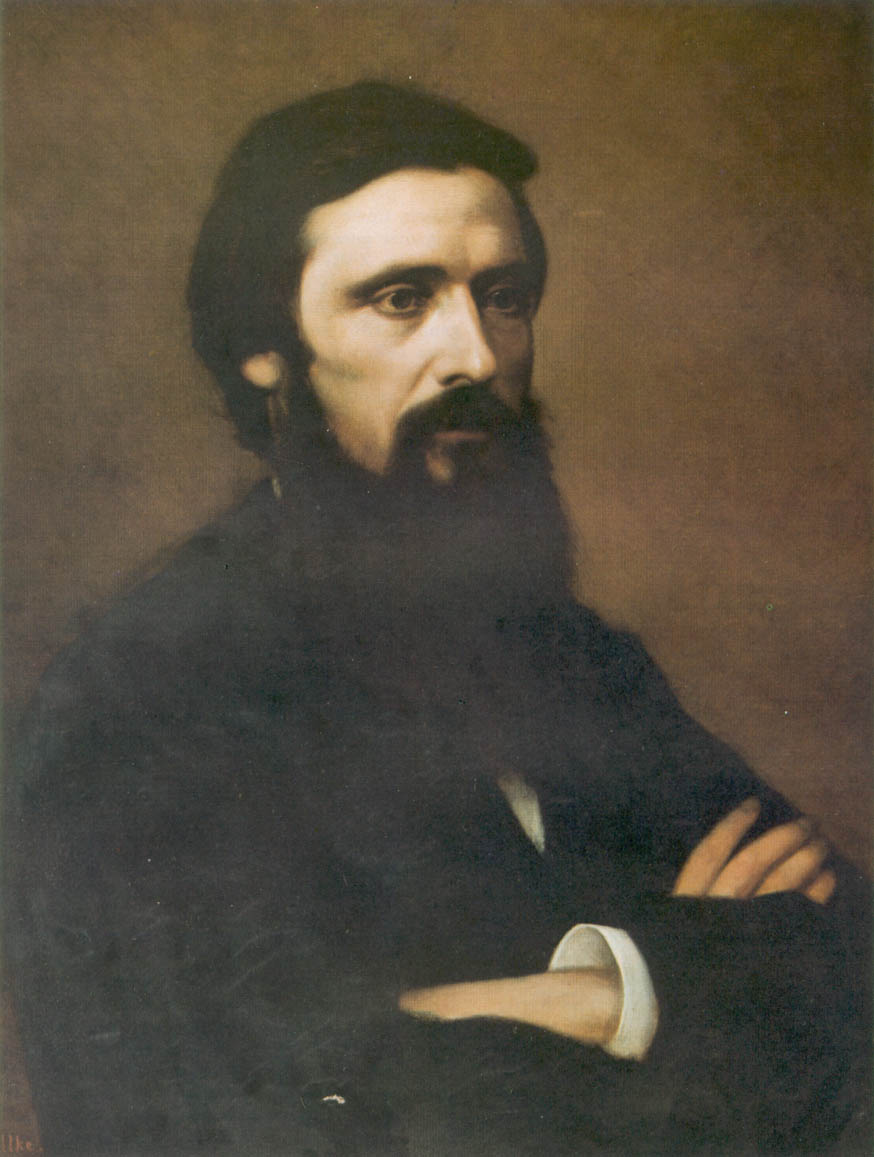
Secretary of War John Aaron Rawlins Henry Ulke, 1873

=== Overview ===
When Grant became president, Rawlins' doctors recommended that he go to Arizona, where they believed the dry desert climate would allow him to live longer. To accommodate their medical advice, Grant wanted to appoint Rawlins military commander of the Southwest; Rawlins refused, wishing to stay at Grant's side. Grant acquiesced and appointed Rawlins as Secretary of War. During his five months in office, Rawlins was at odds with Secretary of State Hamilton Fish over whether to recognize and support a revolution against the Spanish government in Cuba; Rawlins favored providing military aid and other assistance; Fish was opposed. Both competed for Grant's support and that of the other cabinet secretaries. Grant finally sided with Fish and the U.S did not intervene. On the question of dealing with the Mormons located primarily in Utah Territory, Rawlins convinced Grant to adopt a confrontational approach to ending their practice of polygamy, including the use of the military if necessary. Rawlins' health continued to deteriorate; he was bedridden before he died in office. One of his last acts as Secretary of War was his approval of the construction of the Brooklyn Bridge.

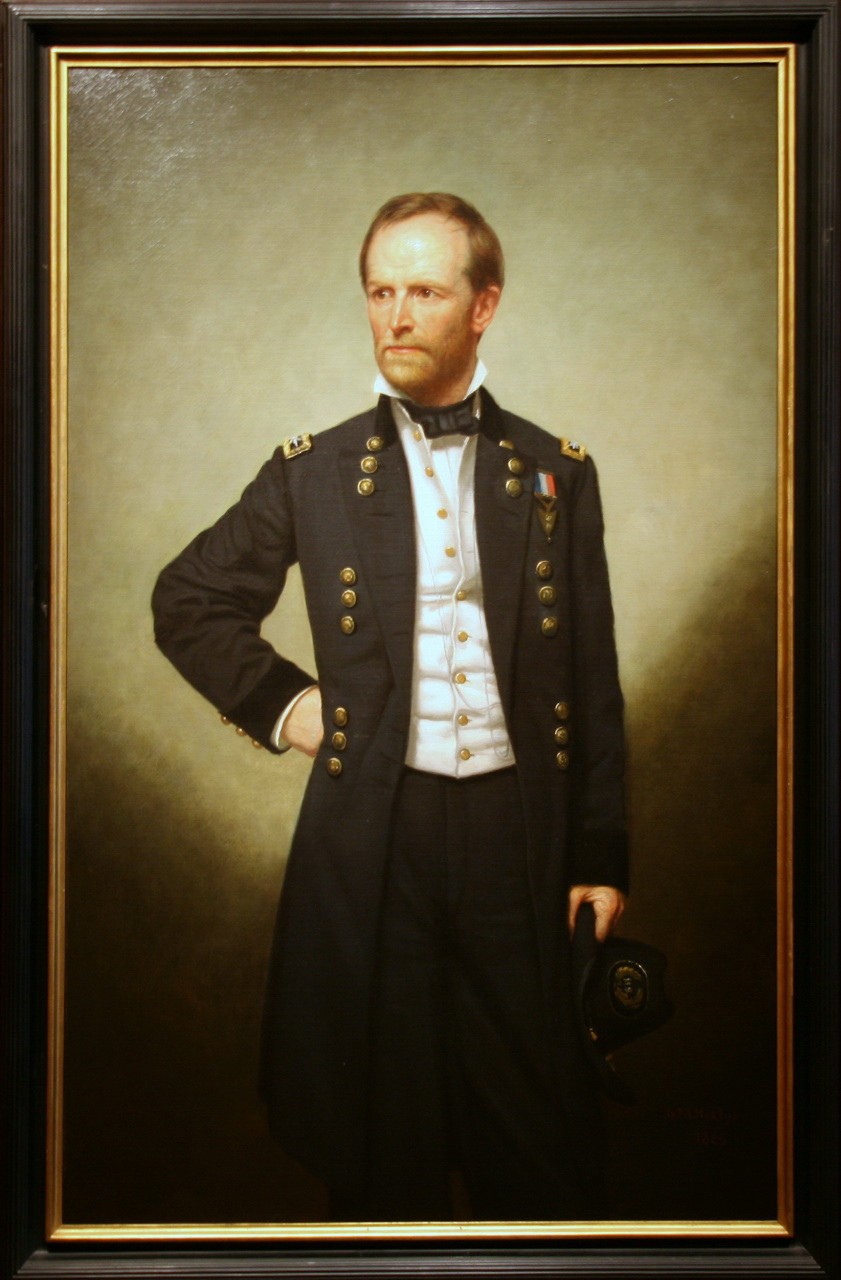
General William T. Sherman Healy, 1866

=== Sherman controversy ===
When Grant became President he promoted William T. Sherman his friend and fellow general during the Civil War the top command of General of the Armies in March 1869. During this time General John M. Schofield was Grant's interim Secretary of War, a carry-over from the Andrew Johnson administration. Initially, Grant had given Sherman broad powers over the U.S. Military, including having authority over bureau chiefs, causing Sherman to believe his relationship to Grant during Grant's presidency would be the same as his close relationship to Grant during the Civil War. When Rawlins became Secretary of War his first actions were to significantly reduce General Sherman's authority in the U.S. military. Rawlins had requested to Grant to give him authority over bureau chiefs and Grant complied, knowing Rawlins was in ill health. Sherman hurried to the White House and asked that Grant rescind his orders that reduced Sherman's authority. Knowing that Rawlins was gravely ill Grant told Sherman that he would not rescind his orders. This upset Sherman, and after a disagreement over military and presidential protocol, Sherman stood up and walked out of the meeting saying "Good day Mister President!". Grant and Sherman had formerly been on first name familiarity. After this incident, Grant and Sherman were not on the same friendly manner they had been during the Civil War. Rawlins' successor, William W. Belknap, also continued this trend and reduced Sherman's authority in the U.S. military, taking away Sherman's authority to appoint post-trader commissions.

=== Anti-Mormon policy ===
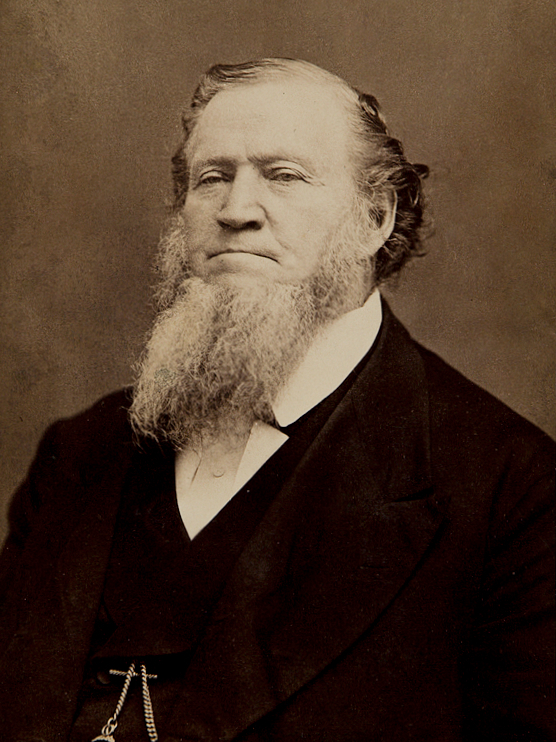
Brigham Young

In 1869, Grant sent Rawlins to Utah Territory in hopes he would recover from his declining health and in part to observe the condition of Mormons there. This was Rawlins second time in Utah, having traveled with Dodge to Salt Lake City in 1867. Rawlins was very cool to his reception of Mormons in Utah including Mormon leader Brigham Young, whom he met twice, who was surrounded by a Mormon military escort. Inwardly, Rawlins was hostile to Young and the Mormon polygamists. When Rawlins returned to Washington he convinced Grant to develop a harsh policy against the religious sect. Rawlins also convinced Grant to appoint John Wilson Shaffer Governor of Utah Territory. Shaffer implemented a strict policy that was designed to keep the Mormons from rebelling from the United States. The Mormons, according to Grant, were in a militant state of rebellion over the issue of polygamy. Grant went on to arrest many Mormons, including Young, in a crackdown by federal marshals Grant believed would keep the Mormons from separating from the United States and to disrupt their practice of polygamy.

=== Cuban insurrection ===
In 1868, the Cuban Revolution began when rebels on Cuba tried to overthrow Spanish rule. Many Americans rallied behind the rebellion and began to sell war bonds in support of the recognition of Cuban belligerency. In 1869, President Grant's Secretary of State Hamilton Fish was unwilling to support the Cuban rebels since the United States had recently gone through the Civil War. Also at stake was negotiations for settlement of the Alabama Claims, that included the claim the British had recognized Confederate belligerency during the Civil War. The recognition of Cuban belligerency would have jeopardized negotiations between Britain and the United States. Secretary Rawlins, however, was strongly in favor of the recognition of Cuban belligerency and even advocated war with Spain, if necessary. Rawlins went to the press and stated the reasons why the United States needed to aid the Cuban rebels. Rawlins himself had controversially accepted $28,000 in Cuban War bonds that would have been given face value if the Cuban rebels were recognized by the United States. Political infighting over recognizing Cuban belligerency took place in Grant's Cabinet. Secretary Fish, however, was able to convince Grant over Rawlins' impassioned arguments not to intervene in Cuba. At this time Rawlins was becoming increasingly ill and was confined to his bed.

=== Approval of Brooklyn Bridge construction ===
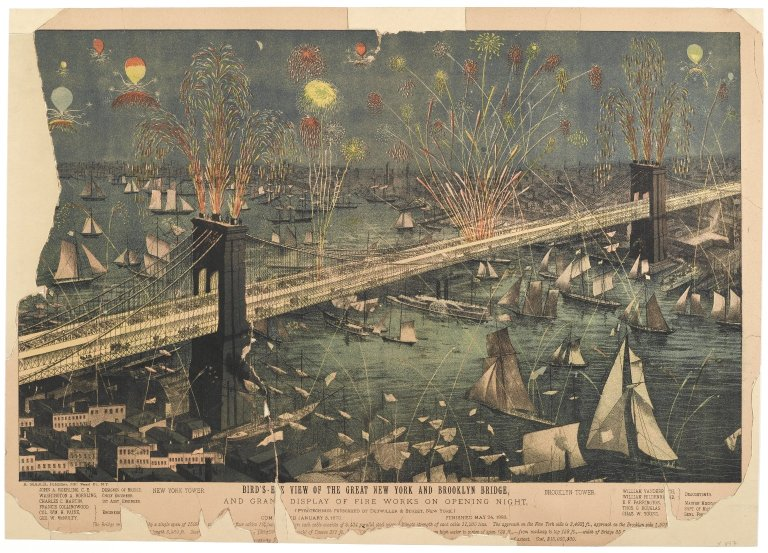
Celebration opening night of the Brooklyn Bridge, 1883

One of Rawlins' last and most complicated acts as Secretary of War was the approval of the construction of the Brooklyn Bridge, a steel suspension bridge to connect the borough of Manhattan and the then independent city of Brooklyn over the East River. Controversy ensued when shipping interests demanded a high grade of the bridge to allow large ships to pass under, while the bridge construction company demanded a lower bridge span. Although Rawlins was severely ill, he took several days minutely and carefully going over the construction plans to settle the matter. The bridge company desired a maximum 130 feet height while the shipping interests wanted a minimal 140 feet height. In front of both shipping and bridge representatives, Rawlins fixed the maximum height of the Brooklyn Bridge at 135 feet above the East's high water mark. The bridge company was prohibited from giving a different order of approval of the bridge's construction. Construction of the Brooklyn Bridge followed several months later, but Rawlins condition was terminal and he did not have long to live. The Brooklyn Bridge was finally completed in 1883 under much celebration and is one of the oldest working bridges in the United States.

=== Last cabinet meeting and death ===
By late August 1869, Rawlins' "consumption" had progressed, and while he was staying at his home in Danbury, Connecticut with his wife and children, he hemorrhaged. Called to the capital for a cabinet meeting, his wife and children stayed behind, while Rawlins set off for Washington. In New York, Rawlins hemorrhaged again, but he continued his journey to see the President. Making it to the capital he hemorrhaged again, but he made it to the cabinet meeting and sat at his regular chair. Grant and Secretary Fish were surprised to see him there. The next day Rawlins had a long meeting with Grant at the White House, whereupon Grant said goodbye to his friend, and left Washington for Saratoga to join his wife Julia. Rawlins was left alone without wife or family in Washington, but another close wartime friend, Ely Parker, cared for him. The following day, Sunday, September 5, Grant was informed of Rawlins' declining health, and he set back to Washington determined to see his friend before he died, but his trip was delayed. Sherman and Grant's Secretary of Interior Jacob D. Cox stayed with Rawlins at his bedside waiting for Grant to arrive. When Rawlins asked when Grant was going to arrive Sherman gently lied to him and said "about 10 minutes". Rawlins, however, persisted on asking his doctor, D. Willard Bliss, when Grant was coming to see him.

The following day on Monday, September 6, 1869, Secretary of War Rawlins died in office at 4:12 PM. Grant arrived at Rawlins' at 5:15 PM, too late to see his friend. Historian William McFeely said concerning Grant missing Rawlins' death that no one "could replace John Rawlins. Now in the first year of the frightening business of the presidency, Rawlins was stolen from Grant, and he had not even been on hand to protest the theft." Rawlins was initially buried in a friend's vault at Congressional Cemetery; his remains were later relocated to Arlington National Cemetery. Rawlins was succeeded as Secretary of War by Sherman on an interim basis, and permanently by William W. Belknap.

Rawlins was survived by his second wife Mary Hurlburt and two children from his first marriage. After his death, Grant served as guardian to Rawlins' two children, who lived with their maternal grandparents in Goshen, New York.

== Honors and historical evaluations ==
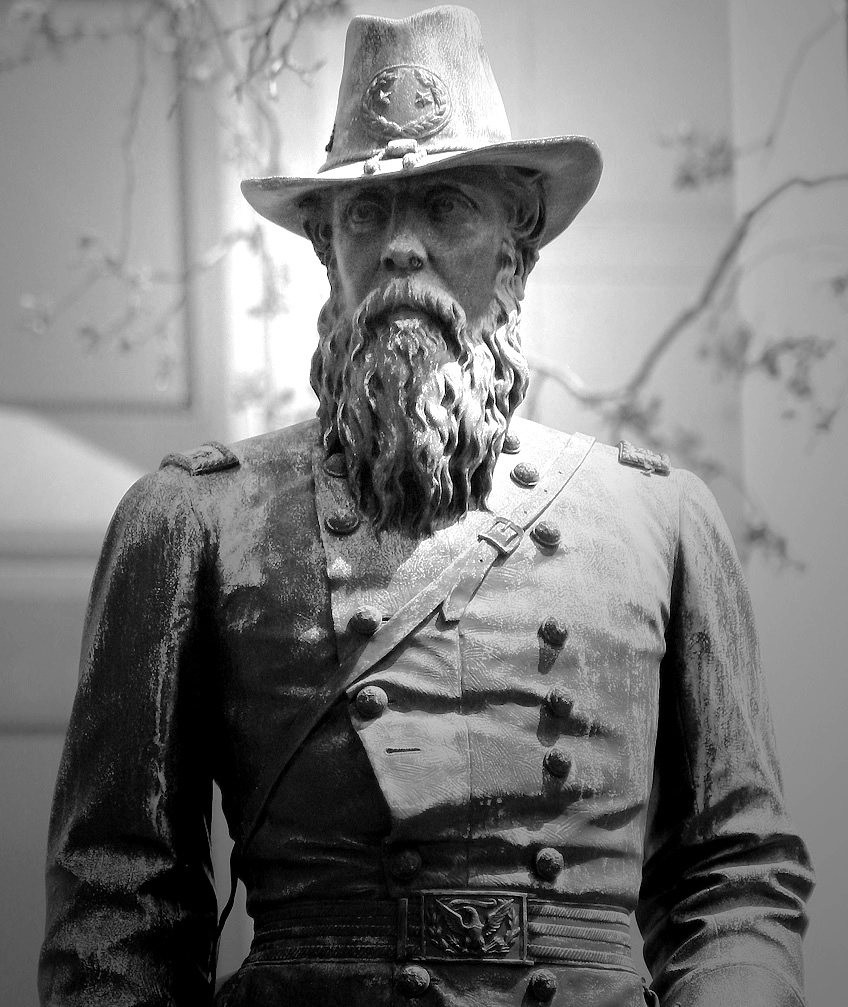
Statue of John Aaron Rawlins in Washington, D.C.

A statue, General John A. Rawlins was erected in Washington, D.C., in 1874. Rawlins Township, Jo Daviess County, Illinois, the town of Rawlins, county seat of Carbon County, Wyoming, as well as Rawlins County, Kansas, are all named after him.

Rawlins devoted his efforts to maintaining Grant's public image during the war. Grant was known before the war for trouble with alcoholism, but it was revealed, in a letter from Rawlins to Grant (which Grant never saw), that Grant maintained his sobriety during his command of the Army. In this letter, made public in 1891—several years after Grant's death—Rawlins wrote, "I find you where the wine bottle has been emptied, in company with those who drink, and urge you not to do likewise." Rawlins noted that this advice was "heeded, and all went well", thus proving that Grant was not impaired by drink when his decision-making was critical. Contemporaries account described him as “the Soul of Grant’s Cabinet” and “supremely executive” for his administrative skill and influence on Grant’s decisions.

There was speculation that by the time Rawlins died, he and Grant had grown distant and that Grant no longer needed Rawlins's constant fussing over his image. When Rawlins died, only his temporary successor as Secretary of War, General William Tecumseh Sherman, was at his bedside. In his memoirs, written shortly before his death, Grant only mentioned Rawlins a few times, and essentially ignored their professional and personal relationship. Surviving members of Grant's former staff were outraged at the fact that Grant would snub someone who had been so useful and as loyal to him—literally to the death—as Rawlins had been. The most likely explanation for this is given by historian E.B. Long, who wrote, "It might be that Grant did not wish to praise Rawlins too profusely because of the current reports picturing Rawlins as the protector of Grant from his own bad habits."

Rawlins's anti-Mormon policy was part of a general latter half of the 19th-century hysteria campaign against Mormons. In 1862, President Abraham Lincoln signed into law the Morrill Anti-Bigamy Act that outlawed polygamy. This law was not enforced until Secretary of War Rawlins, appointed by President Ulysses S. Grant in 1869, had convinced Grant to set up an anti-Mormon policy in the Utah Territory. To further prosecution of Mormon polygamy, including the arrest of Mormons, President Grant signed into law the Poland Act (1874) that allowed the federal government to choose juries that could prosecute polygamists. The law put all Mormons in the Utah Territory under the control of the U.S. Marshal and U.S. Attorney. Two more anti-Mormon bills were passed including the Edmunds Act (1882), signed into law by President Chester A. Arthur, and the Edmunds–Tucker Act (1887), signed into law by President Grover Cleveland.

Two of Grant's biographers, Ron Chernow, Grant (2017) and Jean Edward Smith, Grant (2001), have credited Rawlins's support of Jewish people during the Civil War. Rawlins strongly objected to Grant's offensive General Order No. 11, which expelled Jewish families from Grant's Union military district.

An Endicott Era coast artillery battery at Fort Flagler was named after Rawlins in 1906.

== Military appointments ==
- Captain, Assistant Military Adjutant General, US Volunteers August 30, 1861
- Major and Assistant Adjutant General, US Volunteers May 14, 1862
- Lieutenant Colonel and Assistant Adjutant General, US Volunteers November 1, 1862
- Brigadier General, US Volunteers August 11, 1863
- Brevet Major General, US Volunteers February 24, 1865
- Brigadier General, United States Army and Chief of Staff to the Commanding General March 3, 1865
- Brevet Major General, United States Army April 9, 1865
- Resigned March 12, 1869
- Total military service time starting from first appointment date up to and including resignation date 2752 days or 7 years, 6 months, 13 days

== See also ==
- List of American Civil War generals (Union)
- Bibliography of the American Civil War
- Bibliography of Ulysses S. Grant
- William S. Hillyer – Another member of General Grant's original staff

== Sources ==
=== Books ===
- Catton, Bruce (1968). Grant Takes Command. Boston: Little, Brown. ISBN 0-316-13210-1.
- Chernow, Ron (2017). Grant. New York: Penguin Press. ISBN 978-05255-2195-2.
- Eicher, John H., and Eicher, David J., Civil War High Commands, Stanford University Press, 2001, ISBN 0-8047-3641-3.
- Flood, Charles Bracelen (2005). Grant and Sherman: The Friendship That Won the Civil War. Harper Perennial. ISBN 978-0-06-114871-2.
- Johnson, Rossiter, ed. (1906). The Biographical Dictionary of America Rawlins, John Aaron. Vol. 9. Boston: American Biographical Society. pp. 51–52.
- McFeely, William S. (1981). Grant: A Biography. Norton. ISBN 0-393-01372-3.
- Miller, Donald L. (2019). Vicksburg: Grant's Campaign That Broke the Confederacy. Simon and Schuster. ISBN 978-1-4516-4137-0.
- Smith, Jean Edward (2001). Grant. New York: Simon & Schuster. ISBN 0-684-84927-5.
- Spaulding, Oliver L. Jr. (1935). Dumas Malone (ed.). Dictionary of American Biography Rawlins, John Aaron. New York: Charles Scribner's Sons.
- Wilson, James Harrison (1916). The Life of John A. Rawlins. New York: The Neale Publishing Company.

=== Newspapers ===
- "General John A. Rawlins" (PDF). New York Times. New York. September 7, 1869.

Political offices
Preceded by John M. Schofield	U.S. Secretary of War; Served under: Ulysses S. Grant; March 13, 1869 – September 6, 1869	Succeeded by William W. Belknap
