= John Rawlinson (cricketer, born 1867) =

English cricketer

Personal information
- Full name: John Baldwin Rawlinson
- Born: 1 May 1867; Whitehaven, Cumberland, England
- Died: 12 May 1945 (aged 78); Kensington, London, England
- Batting: Right-handed
- Bowling: Right-arm fast

Domestic team information
- Years: Team
- 1887: Oxford University

Career statistics
Competition	First-class
Matches	1
Runs scored	0
Batting average	0.00
100s/50s	–/–
Top score	0
Balls bowled	84
Wickets	1
Bowling average	45.00
5 wickets in innings	–
10 wickets in match	–
Best bowling	1/45
Catches/stumpings	1/–
- Source: Cricinfo, 17 April 2020

John Baldwin Rawlinson (1 May 1867 – 12 May 1945) was an English first-class cricketer and stockbroker.

The son of Robert Rawlinson, he was born in May 1867 at Whitehaven. He was educated at Malvern College, before going up to Brasenose College, Oxford. While studying at Oxford, he made a single appearance in first-class cricket for Oxford University against A. J. Webbe's XI at Oxford in 1887. Batting once in the match, he was dismissed without scoring in the Oxford first innings by John Rawlin, while with the ball he took a single wicket when he dismissed Albert Leatham in the A. J. Webbe's XI first innings. Rawlinson died at Kensington in May 1945.
