= Rawlins Township, Illinois =

Rawlins Township
- Township
- Location in Jo Daviess County

- Jo Daviess County's location in Illinois
- Coordinates: 42°26′45″N 90°26′32″W
- Country: United States
- State: Illinois
- County: Jo Daviess
- Established: July 12, 1887

Government
  - Supervisor: Dorothy Petitgout

Area
  - Total: 11.72 sq mi (30.4 km^{2})
  - Land: 11.72 sq mi (30.4 km^{2})
  - Water: 0 sq mi (0 km^{2}) 0%
- Elevation: 850 ft (259 m)

Population (2020)
  - Total: 522
  - Density: 44.5/sq mi (17.2/km^{2})
- Time zone: UTC-6 (CST)
  - Summer (DST): UTC-5 (CDT)
- ZIP codes: 61025, 61036
- FIPS code: 17-085-62926

Rawlins Township is one of 23 townships in Jo Daviess County, Illinois, United States. As of the 2020 census, its population was 522 and it had 254 housing units. It was formed as Grant Township from West Galena Township on July 12, 1887; its name changed to Rawlins Township on December 20, 1887 in honor of Galena resident John Aaron Rawlins.

== Geography ==
According to the 2021 census gazetteer files, Rawlins Township has a total area of 11.72 square miles (30.35 km^{2}), all land.

=== Cities, towns, villages ===
- Galena

=== Major highways ===
- U.S. Route 20
- Illinois Route 84

== Demographics ==
As of the 2020 census there were 522 people, 252 households, and 239 families residing in the township. The population density was 44.55 inhabitants per square mile (17.20/km^{2}). There were 254 housing units at an average density of 21.68 per square mile (8.37/km^{2}). The racial makeup of the township was 94.25% White, 0.00% African American, 0.00% Native American, 1.53% Asian, 0.00% Pacific Islander, 0.77% from other races, and 3.45% from two or more races. Hispanic or Latino people of any race were 2.30% of the population.

There were 252 households, out of which 20.60% had children under the age of 18 living with them, 94.84% were married couples living together, 0.00% had a female householder with no spouse present, and 5.16% were non-families. 5.20% of all households were made up of individuals, and 5.20% had someone living alone who was 65 years of age or older. The average household size was 2.19 and the average family size was 2.26.

The township's age distribution consisted of 11.8% under the age of 18, 2.5% from 18 to 24, 8.2% from 25 to 44, 15.8% from 45 to 64, and 61.8% who were 65 years of age or older. The median age was 70.2 years. For every 100 females, there were 101.5 males. For every 100 females age 18 and over, there were 99.6 males.

The median income for a household in the township was $69,599, and the median income for a family was $69,480. Males had a median income of $53,553 versus $36,848 for females. The per capita income for the township was $36,593. None of the population was below the poverty line.

Historical population
Census	Pop.	Note	%±
2000	437		—
2010	455		4.1%
2020	522		14.7%
U.S. Decennial Census

== School districts ==
- Galena Unit School District 120

== Political districts ==
- Illinois' 16th congressional district
- State House District 89
- State Senate District 45
