= Peter Rawlings =

- Born: Kingston upon Hull
- Citizenship: UK
- Education: University of Hull Open University University of Cambridge
- Known for: Henry James studies
- Scientific career
- Fields: American literature, Henry James, Lionel Trilling, Wayne C. Booth, Sinclair Lewis, Modernity, nineteenth-century fiction and Shakespeare
- Workplaces: University of the West of England; Kyushu University, Japan

Peter Rawlings (born 18 June 1951) was Professor of English and American Literature and formerly Associate Dean for Research in the Faculty of Arts, Creative Industries and Education University of the West of England. Born and raised in Hull, Rawlings left school at fifteen without any qualifications. He worked as a clerk and then as a stock controller, studying for 'A' levels by distance learning. He embarked on an Open University course, gaining a first class honours degree in Humanities, while simultaneously completing a degree in English Language and Literature at the University of Hull, for which he also gained a first. His doctorate was at Cambridge University where his specialism was Henry James and the Discourse of Organicism. He later completed an MA in Education Management at the Open University. He has held teaching posts at North East Surrey College of Technology, Kyushu University in Japan where he was Associate Professor of English, before joining UWE in 2000. His teaching specialisms are American literature, nineteenth-century fiction and Shakespeare.

Rawlings is a member of the British Association for American Studies, the English Literature Society of Japan, the Shakespeare Society of Japan, and the American Literature Society of Japan. He is past elected member of the executive committee of the Midwest branch of the Modern Language Association of America. As well as teaching at UWE he regularly visits Japan to supervise PhD students.

== Publications ==
- (With Koji Otsu, Yubun Suzuki, Toshiya Tanaka, and Michio Tokumi) A Passage to English. Kyushu, Japan: Kyushu University Press, 2000.
- Henry James and the Abuse of the Past. Basingstoke and New York: Palgrave Macmillan, 2005.
- American Theorists of the Novel: Henry James, Lionel Trilling, Wayne C. Booth. London and New York: Routledge, 2006.
- Transatlantic Sensations: Henry James and the Empirical Traditions (forthcoming)
- a complete list of works edited, papers and other publications can be found at Peter Rawlings cv
