= Rawling =

Rawling is a British surname that may refer to

- Brian Rawling, British record producer and songwriter
- Cecil Rawling (1870–1917), British soldier, explorer and author
- James Normington Rawling (1898–1966), Australian political activist and writer
- John Rawling, British boxing, athletics, darts and yachting commentator
- Monica Rawling, a fictional character from the FX television show The Shield
- Tom Rawling (1916–1996), British teacher and poet

== See also ==
- Rawlings
