= William Reginald Rawlings =

Australian soldier

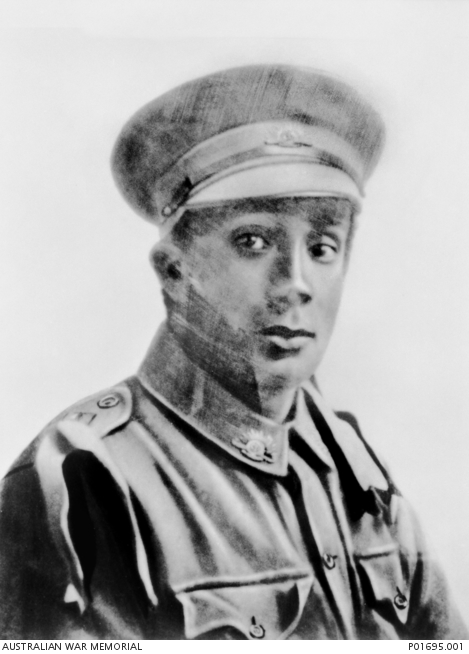
- Born: September 1890; Purnim, Australia
- Died: 9 August 1918 (aged 27); Vauvillers, France
- Burial place: Heath Cemetery, Harbonnieres
- Military career
- Allegiance: Australia
- Branch: Australian Imperial Force
- Service years: 1916–1918
- Rank: Private
- Service number: 3603
- Unit: 29th Battalion
- Conflicts: First World War; Western Front; Hundred Days Offensive; Battle of Amiens †
- Awards: Military Medal

William Reginald Rawlings, MM (September 1890 – 9 August 1918) was a decorated Australian Aboriginal soldier of the First World War. He was also the uncle of Captain Reginald Saunders, the first Aboriginal commissioned officer in the Australian Military Forces.

== Early life ==
Rawlings was born in Purnim, Victoria, in September 1890 to William and Bessie Rawlings. He grew up on the Aboriginal reserve at Framlingham, and was a horse-breaker around Purnim before enlisting in the Australian Imperial Force at Warrnambool, Victoria on 20 March 1916.

== First World War ==
After undertaking initial training, Rawlings embarked on HMAT Orsova from Melbourne on 1 August 1916. He joined the 29th Battalion, 8th Brigade in France, as part of the battalion's 8th Reinforcements.

Rawlings was awarded the Military Medal for bravery during heavy fighting along the Morlancourt Ridge on 28–29 July 1918. Private Rawlings was killed in action on 9 August 1918, during the capture of Vauvillers, France. Rawlings was 27 years old. His MM was gazetted on 11 December 1918.

Rawlings' friend, Harry Thorpe, who also received the Military Medal, was killed on the same day. They are both buried in the Heath Cemetery, Harbonnieres, France.
