= Barney Rawlings =

Bernard Rawlings
- Born: Bernard Wayne Rawlings; 1920
- Died: July 19, 2004 (aged 83–84)
- Allegiance: United States
- Branch: United States Air Force
- Conflicts: Second World War

Bernard (Barney) Wayne Rawlings (1920 – July 19, 2004) was an American Eighth Air Force pilot. He is noted for having been co-pilot of the B-17 bomber, "G.I. Sheets", which was shot down over Belgium in 1944 during World War II.

== Biography ==
After his plane was shot down, Rawlings was aided by resistance fighters in Belgium and France and made his way to Spain. After a brief incarceration, he was repatriated. Arriving at Gibraltar on 22.5.44 and flown to the UK arriving on 25.5.44.

Following the war, Barney Rawlings became a pilot for Trans World Airlines, ultimately becoming a 747 captain. He retired in 1987.

== Legacy and recognition ==
Rawlings' story is recounted in Half a Wing, Three Engines, and a Prayer by Brian D. O'Neill (McGraw-Hill Professional, 1999), and The Last Airman, by Roger Rawlings (Harper & Row, 1989).

A year prior to his retirement, he and the surviving members of his World War II crew returned to Belgium where, in the town of Solre-Saint-Géry, a granite monument had been erected in their honor - and, by extension, in honor of all Allied air crews who fought for the liberation of Europe.

The dedication ceremony included presentations by NATO, the United States Air Force, and the Belgian Air Force, which conducted a fly-over by four Belgian jet aircraft.
