= Harbonnières =

- Commune
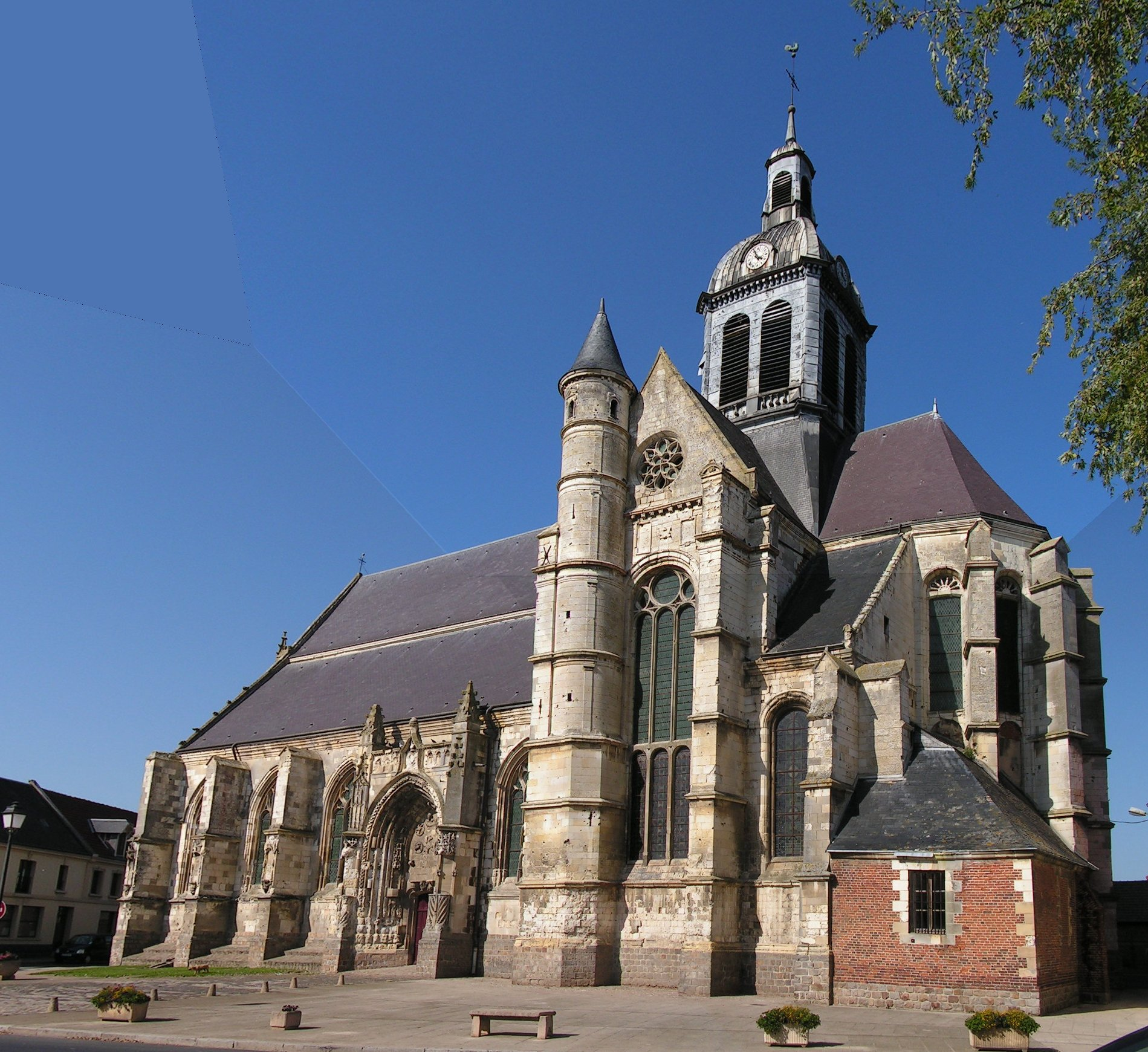
- The church in Harbonnières

- Coat of arms
- Location of Harbonnières
- Location within France Location within Hauts-de-France
- Coordinates: 49°50′58″N 2°40′14″E
- Country: France
- Region: Hauts-de-France
- Department: Somme
- Arrondissement: Péronne
- Canton: Moreuil
- Intercommunality: CC Terre de Picardie

Government
  - Mayor (2023–2026): Georgette Sciascia
- Area^{1}: 15.37 km^{2} (5.93 sq mi)
- Elevation: 91 m (299 ft)
- Highest elevation: 94 m (308 ft)
- Lowest elevation: 60 m (200 ft)
- Population (2023): 1,640
  - Density: 107/km^{2} (276/sq mi)
- Time zone: UTC+01:00 (CET)
  - Summer (DST): UTC+02:00 (CEST)
- INSEE/Postal code: 80417 /80131
- ^{1} French Land Register data, which excludes lakes, ponds, glaciers > 1 km^{2} (0.386 sq mi or 247 acres) and river estuaries.

Harbonnières (French pronunciation: [aʁbɔnjɛʁ]; Picard: Harbounière) is a commune in the Somme department in Hauts-de-France in northern France.

== Geography ==
The commune is situated on the D337 road, 34 kilometres (21 mi) east of Amiens.

== Population ==
Historical population
Year	Pop.	±% p.a.
1968	1,426	—
1975	1,559	+1.28%
1982	1,371	−1.82%
1990	1,286	−0.80%
1999	1,305	+0.16%
2007	1,461	+1.42%
2012	1,590	+1.71%
2017	1,641	+0.63%
2023	1,640	−0.01%
Source: INSEE

== Places of interest ==
- Saint Martin's church at Harbonnières. A large 15th-century building with a tower topped by a dome. A sundial is visible on the façade.
- Heath Cemetery, a World War I cemettery operated by the Commonwealth War Graves Commission.

== See also ==
- Communes of the Somme department
