= Maurice S. Rawlings =

American cardiologist and author (1922–2010)

Maurice S. Rawlings (May 16, 1922 – January 5, 2010, Chattanooga, Tennessee) was an American cardiologist and author. He is the author of Christian books on near-death experiences.

Rawlings served during World War II in the US Navy during the Korean War and in the US Army. Rawlings was a doctor of President Eisenhower and the Joint Chiefs of Staff. He was assistant clinical professor of medicine at the University of Tennessee. He spent his life in Chattanooga. Rawlings was married to Martha Emilia Rawlings and they had five children.

Rawlings was the author of several books, including: "Beyond the line of death – New clear evidence for the existence of Heaven and Hell" (1987), "To Hell and Back – Afterlife" (1993), which were translated into several languages.
