= Spike Rawlings =

English footballer (1944–2006)

Personal information
- Full name: John Anderson Rawlinson
- Date of birth: 7 April 1944
- Place of birth: Wallsend, England
- Date of death: 14 March 2006 (aged 61)
- Place of death: Newcastle upon Tyne, England
- Position: Centre half

Senior career*
Years	Team	Apps	(Gls)
1964–1965	Bury	2	(0)
1965–1966	Barrow	19	(2)
1966–1968	Runcorn		
1968–1969	Barrow	0	(0)
Total		21	(2)
- * Club domestic league appearances and goals

Spike Rawlings (birth name John Anderson Rawlinson; 7 April 1944 – 14 March 2006) was an English professional footballer who later became a TV entertainer after retiring as a sportsman.

== Career ==
=== Football career ===
After playing for amateur side Corinthian Juniors, Rawlinson - who played as a centre half - made his professional debut for Bury during the 1964–65 season, making a total of two League appearances that season. After the football season finished, Rawlinson moved to Barrow. During the 1965–66 season, Rawlinson scored two goals in nineteen League games for Barrow. Rawlinson later played non-league football for Runcorn, and eventually returned to Barrow (although he never appeared in a first team League game for the club again), where he got his first taste of showbiz in 1969 - after the half-time entertainment failed to show up, Rawlinson stepped in and performed instead.

=== Entertainment career ===
After finishing his career as a professional footballer, Rawlinson adopted the stage name of Spike Rawlings. His early career was spent warming audiences up on local TV show Those Wonderful TV Times. He achieved fame by winning the 1976 edition of TV talent show Opportunity Knocks, which allowed him to have his own TV show. He later had a small part on When the Boat Comes In, and he regularly acted in pantomimes.

== Later life ==
During the late 1980s and 1990s, Rawlings suffered from financial issues. He died in March 2006 in hospital, awaiting a liver transplant. A charity night, organised by his children Matthew and Catherine, was held in October 2006 in Rawlings' memory.
