= United States sanctions against China =

The Government of the United States (U.S.) has applied economic sanctions against certain institutions and key members of the government of the People's Republic of China (PRC), Chinese Communist Party (CCP), certain companies linked to the People's Liberation Army (PLA), and other affiliates that the U.S. government has accused of aiding in human rights abuses. The U.S. maintained embargoes against China from the inception of the People's Republic of China in 1949 until 1972. It reimposed an embargo following the 1989 Tiananmen Square protests and massacre. From 2020 onward, the U.S. imposed sanctions and visa restrictions against several Chinese government officials and companies, citing persecution of Uyghurs in China, human rights abuses in Hong Kong and Tibet, military–civil fusion, support for the Russian invasion of Ukraine, support for Iran, transnational repression, and fentanyl production.

Economic sanctions and export controls against China by the U.S. are administered by the Department of the Treasury's Office of Foreign Assets Control (OFAC) and enforced by the Department of Commerce's Bureau of Industry and Security (BIS).

One of the primary objectives of US sanctions against Chinese enterprises is to restrict the development of China's high-tech companies. However, research indicates that while such policies may disrupt normal business operations in the short term, they can also strengthen the sanctioned enterprises' commitment to independent research and development to some extent. In particular, companies placed on the "Entity List" may become more determined to invest in scientific research and actively explore how to drive their own innovation through scientific study.

== Early history ==
The Chinese Civil War devastated the country's economy. After the establishment of the PRC in 1949, the U.S. embargo against the sale of military technology or infrastructure, previously levied against the Soviet Union, was expanded to include the newly established PRC. During the Korean War, further trade restrictions were imposed. The embargo compounded the economic damage in China from its Civil War and limited China's access to credit, technology, and materials from the Western Bloc. As a result, in the 1950s the Soviet Union and Eastern Bloc countries were China's only source of foreign economic, material, and technical support. The PRC pursued a policy of rapid industrialization relying primarily on domestic resources. The embargo resulted in increased Chinese nationalism.

The United States embargo against the PRC, including its prohibition on exporting penicillin to China, was one of the factors which shaped the pharmaceutical industry in the early PRC.

The trade embargo was lifted under President Richard Nixon in 1972 right before the reform and opening up period and establishment of official relations. But after the 1989 Tiananmen Square massacre, the Bush Sr. administration re-imposed an arms embargo against the PRC after the massacre of the protesters.

== 21st century ==
Due to concerns about national security and human rights, the United States has gradually increased sanctions against Chinese businesses and organizations. As of July 2023, 721 Chinese businesses, organizations, and individuals have been added to the United States Department of Commerce's Entity List that restricts their ability to purchase goods from the United States.

=== Iran-related ===
In 2023, the U.S. imposed sanctions on Chang Guang Satellite Technology, a Chinese state-owned enterprise that has provided geospatial intelligence to the Houthis. In October 2025, the U.S. added 15 Chinese companies to the Entity List for providing drone technology to the Houthis, Hamas, and the Islamic Revolutionary Guard Corps.

Through the Specially Designated Nationals and Blocked Persons List, the United States has sanctioned and prosecuted Chinese companies and individuals for providing material assistance to Iran's missile program. In 2014, the U.S. Treasury Department sanctioned Sinotech Dalian Carbon and Graphite Manufacturing Corporation for helping Iran buy parts to produce ballistic missiles. In June 2023, the U.S. Treasury Department sanctioned Zhejiang Qingji and other entities in mainland China and Hong Kong for selling centrifuge equipment to Iran. In September 2023, six Chinese entities were sanctioned for allegedly assisting the Iran Aircraft Manufacturing Industries Corporation in making drones to attack oil tankers and for export to Russia's military. In April 2025, the U.S. Treasury Department sanctioned Chinese entities accused of being part of an Iranian procurement network. In October 2025, additional Chinese entities and individuals were sanctioned for their involvement in Iranian procurement networks for advanced missile technology.

In March 2025, the U.S. Treasury Department sanctioned a Chinese "teapot" oil refinery, Shouguang Luqing Petrochemical in Shandong, and related executives for violations of international sanctions against Iran. In April 2025, the U.S. sanctioned another teapot oil refinery. During the 2026 Iran war, the U.S. sanctioned a subsidiary of Hengli Group, the Hengli Petrochemical (Dalian) Refinery Co. Ltd. and one of China's largest teapot refineries for processing Iranian crude oil. On 1 May 2026, the National Financial Regulatory Administration ordered Chinese banks to stop extending new loans to five U.S.-sanctioned refineries. But on 2 May 2026, China's Ministry of Commerce ordered companies and banks in the country to disregard U.S. sanctions on Chinese refineries, stating that such sanctions are a violation of international law.

=== Huawei and ZTE ===
In August 2018, President Trump signed the National Defense Authorization Act for Fiscal Year 2019 (NDAA 2019) which banned Huawei and ZTE equipment from being used by the U.S. federal government, citing security concerns.

In addition, on 15 May 2019, the Department of Commerce added Huawei and 70 foreign subsidiaries and "affiliates" to its Entity List under the Export Administration Regulations, citing the company having been indicted for "knowingly and willfully causing the export, re-export, sale and supply, directly and indirectly, of goods, technology and services (banking and other financial services) from the United States to Iran and the government of Iran without obtaining a license from the Department of Treasury's Office of Foreign Assets Control (OFAC)". This restricts U.S. companies from doing business with Huawei without a government license. Various U.S.-based companies immediately froze their business with Huawei to comply with the regulation. That same year, it was determined that Huawei also provided equipment to build North Korea’s 3G network.

=== Currency manipulator designation ===
In August 2019, the United States Department of the Treasury designated China a currency manipulator, which resulted in China being excluded from U.S. government procurement contracts. The designation was withdrawn in January 2020 after China agreed to refrain from devaluing its currency to make its own goods cheaper for foreign buyers.

=== Uyghurs ===
In 2019, the Xinjiang public security bureau and its subordinate municipal PSBs were to the Entity List for their role in human rights abuses against the Uyghurs. In 2020, the United States Department of the Treasury's Office of Foreign Assets Control (OFAC) imposed sanctions on the Xinjiang public security bureau under the Global Magnitsky Act.

The Uyghur Human Rights Policy Act of 2020 (S. 3744) is a United States federal law that requires various United States government bodies to report on human rights abuses by the Chinese Communist Party (CCP) and the Chinese government against Uyghurs in Xinjiang, China, including the Xinjiang internment camps.

The Uyghur Forced Labor Prevention Act (H.R. 6256) is a United States federal law that changed U.S. policy on China's Xinjiang Uyghur Autonomous Region (XUAR, or Xinjiang) with the goal of ensuring that American entities are not funding forced labor among ethnic minorities in the region. It was signed into law in December 2021 and starting from June 21, 2022, any company that imports goods from the Xinjiang region needs to certify that those goods were not produced using forced labor in order to avoid penalties.

=== Hong Kong ===
The United States imposed six rounds of sanctions between 2020 and 2025 under Hong Kong Autonomy Act and Executive Order 13936 after the passage of the national security law for undermining Hong Kong's autonomy and restricting freedom of Hong Kong people. Then Chief Executive Carrie Lam and her successor John Lee, then as Secretary for Justice, were sanctioned along with several Hong Kong and Chinese government officials and legislators.

=== Military–civil fusion ===
On 12 November 2020, President Donald Trump signed Executive Order 13959, titled "Addressing the Threat From Securities Investments That Finance Communist Chinese Military Companies". The executive order prohibits all U.S. investors (institutional and retail investors alike) from purchasing or investing in securities of companies identified by the U.S. Department of Defense as "Communist Chinese military companies." As of 14 January 2021, 44 Chinese companies were identified. Five of these companies are to be delisted by the New York Stock Exchange by March 2021. On 13 January 2021, the executive order was amended to require divestment from the companies by 11 November 2021.

Section 1260H of the National Defense Authorization Act for Fiscal Year 2021 requires the U.S. Department of Defense to release the names of all "Chinese military companies" operating directly or indirect in the United States.

=== Russo–Ukrainian war ===
In April 2022, United States Secretary of Treasury Janet Yellen warned China that it could face consequences for not sanctioning Russia. In June 2022, the United States Department of Commerce placed five Hong Kong companies on the Bureau of Industry and Security's Entity List for providing support to Russia's military. The U.S. Treasury Department separately sanctioned a Chinese and an Armenian vendor for maintaining trade relationship with a Russian arms procurement firm. In September 2022, the Office of Foreign Assets Control sanctioned Sinno Electronics of Shenzhen for supplying a Russian military procurement network.

In January 2023, the U.S. Treasury Department sanctioned Spacety China, also known as Changsha Tianyi Space Science and Technology Research Institute Co. Ltd., for providing satellite imagery to the Wagner Group. In February 2023, the U.S. Commerce Department added AOOK Technology Ltd, Beijing Ti-Tech Science and Technology Development Co, Beijing Yunze Technology Co, and China HEAD Aerospace Technology Co to the Entity List for aiding Russia's military.

In March 2023, the U.S. Treasury Department sanctioned five Chinese companies for supplying equipment to the Iran Aircraft Manufacturing Industries Corporation, which manufactures HESA Shahed 136 drones used by Russia against Ukraine.

In July 2023, the U.S. Office of the Director of National Intelligence published a report stating that the Chinese government is assisting Russia to evade sanctions and providing it with dual-use technology.

In October 2023, the U.S. Department of Commerce added 42 Chinese companies to the Entity List for supplying Russia with microelectronics for missile and drone guidance systems. In April 2024, the Department of Commerce sanctioned a Chinese company for supporting Russia's military through the procurement, development, and proliferation of Russian drones. In May 2024, the U.S. sanctioned 20 companies in mainland China and Hong Kong for supplying Russia's military. In October 2024, the U.S. sanctioned two companies, Xiamen Limbach Aircraft Engine Co. and Redlepus Vector Industry, involving the production of long-range attack drones for Russia, including the Garpiya.

In June 2025, a majority of U.S. senators supported secondary sanctions against Russia that would impose 500% tariffs on countries that buy Russian oil, natural gas, uranium, and other exports. China is one of the main consumers of Russian energy.

=== Semiconductor industry ===
On 7 October 2022, the Bureau of Industry and Security of the United States Department of Commerce implemented controls related to advanced computing and semiconductor manufacturing in China. Some of these controls began immediately whereas others became effective on 12 October 2022, and 21 October 2022.

In March 2023, the U.S. Department of Commerce added 28 additional Chinese firms to the Entity List, including Inspur and Loongson, for acquiring American technology in support of the PLA. In October 2023, the Department of Commerce added Biren Technology and Moore Threads to the Entity List.

In August 2023, President Biden issued Executive Order 14105, titled “Addressing United States Investments in Certain National Security Technologies and Products in Countries of Concern” (the Outbound Order), which prohibits U.S. investments in semiconductors and microelectronics, quantum information technologies, and artificial intelligence technologies in China. In October 2024, the U.S. Treasury Department issued regulations implementing the Outbound Order.

In January 2025, the U.S. Department of Defense updated its Chinese Military Companies (CMC) list under Section 1260H of the National Defense Authorization Act, adding numerous companies like Tencent and COSCO Shipping and removing others. In October 2025, the Department of Defense stated that Alibaba Group, Baidu, BYD Company, Eoptolink, Hua Hong Semiconductor, RoboSense, WuXi AppTec, and Zhongji Innolight merit inclusion on the list. On 9 June 2026, the list was updated to include Alibaba Group, Baidu, BYD, and Unitree. On 22 June 2026, the Chinese Ministry of Commerce responded to the ban by restricting export of dual-use items to a list of American companies, including Oshkosh Defense, L3Harris, MP Materials, USA Rare Earth, etc. According to a 2026 Financial Times report, OpenAI and Google were found selling AI to the companies blacklisted under Section 1260H, including Alibaba, Baidu and Tencent through their Singapore-based subsidiaries. It was suspected that the export rules were circumvented since both OpenAI and Google permit access in jurisdictions like Singapore and Hong Kong.

=== Fentanyl ===
In April 2023, OFAC sanctioned two companies and four individuals in China, pursuant to Executive Order 14059, for supplying precursor chemicals for fentanyl production to drug cartels in Mexico. In May 2023, OFAC sanctioned an additional seven companies and six people in China for supplying equipment to cartels for fentanyl production. In June 2023, U.S. federal prosecutors announced criminal indictments of fentanyl precursor producers in China. In October 2023, OFAC sanctioned a China-based network of fentanyl manufacturers and distributors. In July 2024, OFAC sanctioned individuals in China accused of money laundering for the Sinaloa Cartel.

On 1 February 2025, President Trump issued Executive Order 14195, "Imposing Duties To Address the Synthetic Opioid Supply Chain in the People's Republic of China," which imposes an additional 10% tariff on imports from China. According to the White House Fact Sheet, Chinese officials have failed to take sufficient action to stop the supply of precursor chemicals to criminal cartels or to curb money laundering by transnational criminal organizations. In September 2025, OFAC sanctioned a Chinese company and two of its executives for manufacturing and coordinating shipments of synthetic opioids to the U.S.

=== 2023 Chinese balloon incident ===
In May 2024, the U.S. Commerce Department added 37 units of China Electronics Technology Group Corporation (CETC) to the Entity List for their role in the 2023 Chinese balloon incident.

=== North Korea ===
In July 2024, the U.S. sanctioned several individuals and entities in China for their alleged involvement in the procurement of items for North Korea's ballistic missile and space programs.

=== Cyberattack actors ===
In December 2024, OFAC sanctioned Sichuan Silence Information Technology Company while federal prosecutors indicted one of its employees for ransomware attacks.

=== Restricting Chinese investment ===
In February 2025, President Trump signed a national security presidential memorandum (NSPM), directing the Committee on Foreign Investment in the United States (CFIUS) to restrict Chinese investments in U.S. technology, critical infrastructure, health care, agriculture, energy, raw materials and other sectors. According to Bloomberg, the NSPM commits to using “all necessary legal instruments” in curbing such investments.

=== Intellectual property theft ===
In 2026, the U.S. sanctioned five Chinese companies connected to a former Google engineer accused of intellectual property theft.

== Litigation ==
In January 2021, Xiaomi Corporation filed a lawsuit after being added to the DoD's "Communist Chinese military company" (CCMC) list under § 1237 of the 1999 NDAA and Executive Order 13959. Xiaomi argued that the designation was unconstitutional, citing Fifth Amendment due process violations. The U.S. District Court for the District of Columbia issued a preliminary injunction in March 2021, finding DoD's reasoning unsupported and lacking substantial evidence that China's military controlled Xiaomi. The Biden Administration settled and removed Xiaomi from the CCMC list in May 2021.

In October 2022, DJI was added to a list of "Chinese military companies" operating in the U.S. under § 1260H of the 2021 NDAA. In October 2024, DJI filed a lawsuit against the DoD to have the designation removed, arguing that it "is neither owned nor controlled by the Chinese military." In September 2025, the U.S. District Court for the District of Columbia ruled against DJI, finding that the DoD had substantial evidence supporting its conclusion that DJI contributes to the "Chinese defense industrial base." DJI filed an appeal with the U.S. Court of Appeals for the D.C. Circuit.

== See also ==
- United States foreign policy toward the People's Republic of China
- United States sanctions
- China–United States relations
- Secure and Trusted Communications Networks Act of 2019
- Secure Equipment Act of 2021
- All-American Flag Act
