= Lisuan Tech =

Chinese GPU company

Lisuan Technology Co., Ltd.
- Trade name: Lisuan Tech
- Native name: 砺算科技（上海）有限公司
- Type: Private
- Industry: Semiconductors
- Founded: 2021; 5 years ago
- Founders: Xuan Yifang; Kong Dehai; Niu I-Sing
- Headquarters: Shanghai, China
- Parent: Dosilicon
- Website: www.lisuantech.com

Lisuan Technology Co., Ltd. (Lisuan Tech; Chinese: 砺算科技; pinyin: Lìsuàn Kējì) is a Chinese technology company headquartered in Shanghai.

The company develops graphics processing units (GPUs).

== Background ==
Lisuan Tech was founded in 2021 by three former employees of S3 Graphics. The company aimed to set out to develop GPUs that could compete globally.

In 2024, Lisuan Tech came close to bankruptcy. However, in August that year, it secured around 328 million yuan from Computer memory company Dosilicon and other investors. Dosilicon as an established DRAM product producer could leverage its experience onto Lisuan Tech.

Dosilicon is the largest shareholder of Lisuan Tech holding a 35.87% stake as of 31 August 2025. Despite Lisuan Tech having significant losses in 2024 and 2025, Dosilicon continued to invest in it. Hengtong is another investor in the company. Lisuan Tech's valuation after the new capital injection was at 4.21 billion yuan.

In April 2026, Lisuan Tech became the fourth GPU maker to obtain the Microsoft WHQL Testing certification.

== Product history ==
=== 7G100 series ===
Work on the G100 GPU started in 2021 with a launch date of 2023. However financial difficulties caused delays.

Initial benchmark results for the G100 with 32 CUs in June 2025 were poor showing comparability to the dated GeForce GTX 660 Ti. However next month, a G100 with 48 CUs showed improved performance being 10% slower than the GeForce RTX 5060.

On 26 July 2025, Lisuan Tech launched its first graphics card line, the 7G100 series. Lisuan Tech's debut sparked speculation on China's A-share market, turning Dosilicon into one of the most heavily traded chip stocks.

The 7G106 and 7G105 were built on TSMC's 6 nm N6 process and are powered by Lisuan Tech's in-house TrueGPU architecture that use the G100 GPU. Lisuan Tech claims the TrueGPU architecture is built from scratch including the instruction set, compute core, and software stack. The two products aim to compete directly with mid-range offerings from Nvidia and AMD. While known for gaming purposes, Lisuan Tech is positioning them as multi-purpose accelerators for AI, cloud rendering, and even metaverse applications. The consumer-focused 7G106 features 12 GB of GDDR6 memory on a 192-bit bus, 192 texture units, 96 ROPs, and an FP32 throughput of up to 24 TFLOP/s. The professional 7G105 has 24 GB of memory with ECC, offering up to 192 GB/s of pixel fill rate, 384 GB/s of texture fill rate, and the same 24 TFLOP/s compute ceiling. The 7G106 scored 26,800 points in 3DMark Fire Strike and 2,256 in Steel Nomad, putting it roughly on par with GeForce RTX 4060 in Fire Strike. Geekbench 6 OpenCL saw it notch 111,290 points, edging out the RTX 4060 by around 10%.

In December 2025, it was reported the G100 series had begun shipping out to customers in first batch of deliveries.

== See also ==
- Biren Technology
- Moore Threads
- Semiconductor industry in China
