= List of acts of the 117th United States Congress =

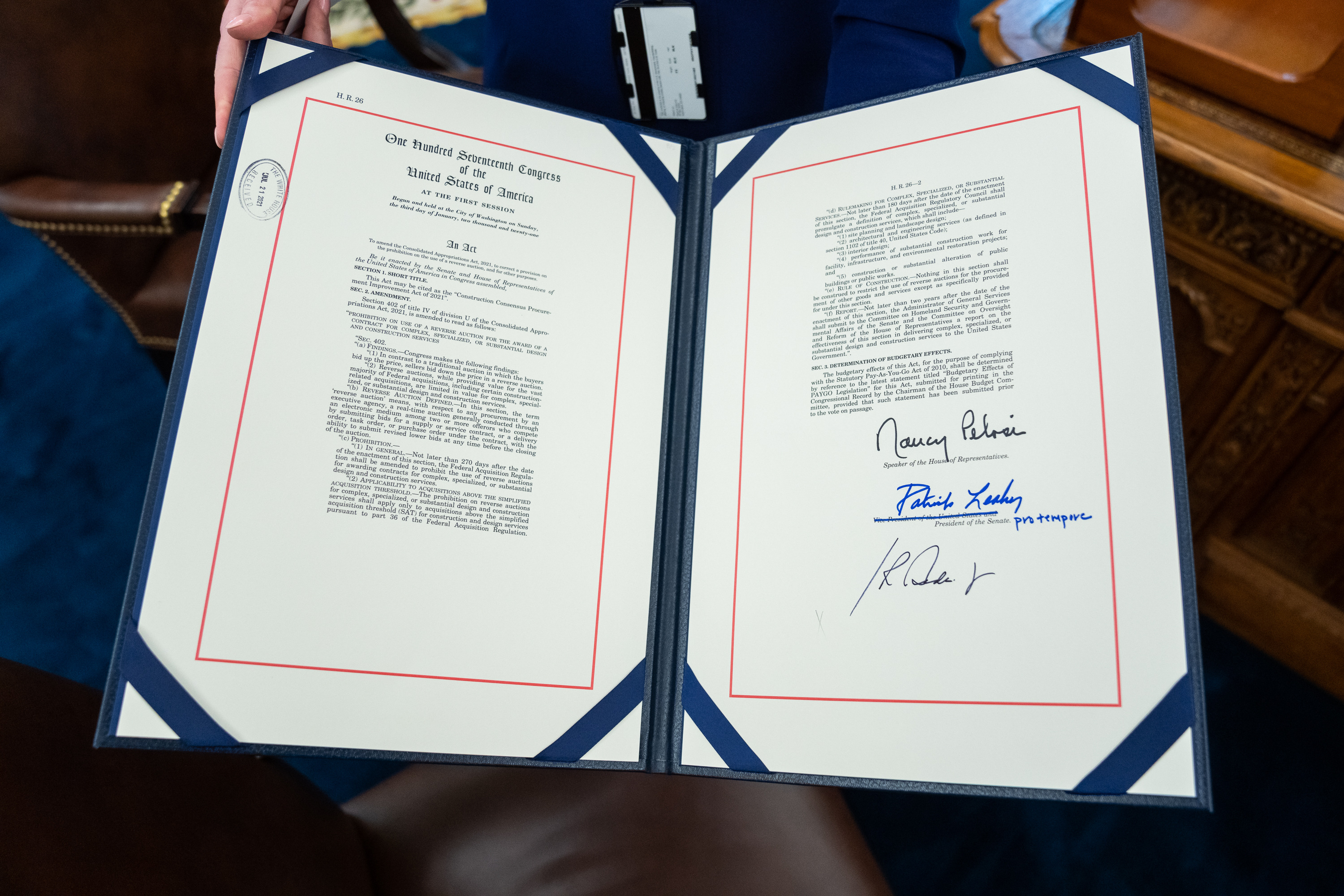
The signed version of the Construction Consensus Procurement Improvement Act of 2021, enacted on July 26, 2021

The 117th United States Congress, which began on January 3, 2021, and ended on January 3, 2023, enacted 362 public laws and 3 private laws. Donald Trump was the incumbent president for the Congress's first seventeen days, but no laws were enacted before his presidential term expired.

== Public laws ==
The 117th Congress has enacted the following laws:

Public law number	Date of enactment	Official short title(s)	Official title	Link to GPO
117-1	January 22, 2021	(No short title)	To provide for an exception to a limitation against appointment of persons as Secretary of Defense within seven years of relief from active duty as a regular commissioned officer of the Armed Forces.	Pub. L. 117–1 (text) (PDF), H.R. 335, 135 Stat. 3, enacted January 22, 2021
117-2	March 11, 2021	American Rescue Plan Act of 2021	To provide for reconciliation pursuant to title II of S. Con. Res. 5.	Pub. L. 117–2 (text) (PDF), H.R. 1319, 135 Stat. 4, enacted March 11, 2021
117-3	March 23, 2021	(No short title)	To make a technical correction to the ALS Disability Insurance Access Act of 2019.	Pub. L. 117–3 (text) (PDF), S. 579, 135 Stat. 246, enacted March 23, 2021
117-4	March 24, 2021	Strengthening and Amplifying Vaccination Efforts to Locally Immunize All Veterans and Every Spouse (SAVE LIVES) Act	To authorize the Secretary of Veterans Affairs to furnish COVID-19 vaccines to certain individuals, and for other purposes.	Pub. L. 117–4 (text) (PDF), H.R. 1276, 135 Stat. 247, enacted March 24, 2021
117-5	March 27, 2021	COVID-19 Bankruptcy Relief Extension Act of 2021	To amend the CARES Act to extend the sunset for the definition of a small business debtor, and for other purposes.	Pub. L. 117–5 (text) (PDF), H.R. 1651, 135 Stat. 249, enacted March 27, 2021
117-6	March 30, 2021	PPP Extension Act of 2021	To amend the Small Business Act and the CARES Act to extend the covered period for the paycheck protection program, and for other purposes.	Pub. L. 117–6 (text) (PDF), H.R. 1799, 135 Stat. 250, enacted March 27, 2021
117-7	April 14, 2021	(No short title)	To prevent across-the-board direct spending cuts, and for other purposes.	Pub. L. 117–7 (text) (PDF), H.R. 1868, 135 Stat. 251, enacted April 14, 2021
117-8	April 23, 2021	Advancing Education on Biosimilars Act of 2021	To educate health care providers and the public on biosimilar biological products, and for other purposes.	Pub. L. 117–8 (text) (PDF), S. 164, 135 Stat. 254, enacted April 23, 2021
117-9	April 23, 2021	(No short title)	To amend the Federal Food, Drug, and Cosmetic Act with respect to the scope of new chemical exclusivity.	Pub. L. 117–9 (text) (PDF), S. 415, 135 Stat. 256, enacted April 23, 2021
117-10	April 23, 2021	Senate Shared Employee Act	To allow Senators, Senators-elect, committees of the Senate, leadership offices, and other offices of the Senate to share employees, and for other purposes.	Pub. L. 117–10 (text) (PDF), S. 422, 135 Stat. 259, enacted April 23, 2021
117-11	April 23, 2021	Food Allergy Safety, Treatment, Education, and Research Act of 2021	To improve the health and safety of Americans living with food allergies and related disorders, including potentially life-threatening anaphylaxis, food protein-induced enterocolitis syndrome, and eosinophilic gastrointestinal diseases, and for other purposes.	Pub. L. 117–11 (text) (PDF), S. 578, 135 Stat. 262, enacted April 23, 2021
117-12	May 4, 2021	Extending Temporary Emergency Scheduling of Fentanyl Analogues Act	To amend the Temporary Reauthorization and Study of the Emergency Scheduling of Fentanyl Analogues Act to extend until October 2021, a temporary order for fentanyl-related substances.	Pub. L. 117–12 (text) (PDF), H.R. 2630, 135 Stat. 264, enacted May 4, 2021
117-13	May 20, 2021	COVID-19 Hate Crimes Act	To facilitate the expedited review of COVID-19 hate crimes, and for other purposes.	Pub. L. 117–13 (text) (PDF), S. 937, 135 Stat. 265, enacted May 20, 2021
117-14	May 24, 2021	Alaska Tourism Restoration Act	To restrict the imposition by the Secretary of Homeland Security of fines, penalties, duties, or tariffs applicable only to coastwise voyages, or prohibit otherwise qualified non-United States citizens from serving as crew, on specified vessels transporting passengers between the State of Washington and the State of Alaska, to address a Canadian cruise ship ban and the extraordinary impacts of the COVID-19 pandemic on Alaskan communities, and for other purposes.	Pub. L. 117–14 (text) (PDF), H.R. 1318, 135 Stat. 273, enacted May 24, 2021
117-15	May 26, 2021	Timely ReAuthorization of Necessary Stem-cell Programs Lends Access to Needed Therapies (TRANSPLANT) Act of 2021	To reauthorize the Stem Cell Therapeutic and Research Act of 2005, and for other purposes.	Pub. L. 117–15 (text) (PDF), H.R. 941, 135 Stat. 277, enacted May 26, 2021
117-16	June 8, 2021	Training in High-demand Roles to Improve Veteran Employment (THRIVE) Act	To amend the American Rescue Plan Act of 2021 to improve the COVID-19 Veteran Rapid Retraining Assistance program, to make certain technical corrections to the Johnny Isakson and David P. Roe, M.D. Veterans Health Care and Benefits Improvement Act of 2020, and for other purposes.	Pub. L. 117–16 (text) (PDF), H.R. 2523, 135 Stat. 280, enacted June 8, 2021
117-17	June 17, 2021	Juneteenth National Independence Day Act	To amend title 5, United States Code, to designate Juneteenth National Independence Day as a legal public holiday.	Pub. L. 117–17 (text) (PDF), S. 475, 135 Stat. 297, enacted June 17, 2021
117-18	June 23, 2021	West Los Angeles VA Campus Improvement Act of 2021	To amend the West Los Angeles Leasing Act of 2016 to authorize the use of certain funds received pursuant to leases entered into under such Act, and for other purposes.	Pub. L. 117–18 (text) (PDF), H.R. 711, 135 Stat. 288, enacted June 23, 2021
117-19	June 23, 2021	(No short title)	Providing for the appointment of Barbara Barrett as a citizen regent of the Board of Regents of the Smithsonian Institution.	Pub. L. 117–19 (text) (PDF), H.J.Res. 27, 135 Stat. 290, enacted June 23, 2021
117-20	June 25, 2021	(No short title)	To designate the National Pulse Memorial located at 1912 South Orange Avenue, Orlando, Florida, 32806, and for other purposes.	Pub. L. 117–20 (text) (PDF), H.R. 49, 135 Stat. 291, enacted June 25, 2021
117-21	June 30, 2021	Sgt. Ketchum Rural Veterans Mental Health Act of 2021	To direct the Secretary of Veterans Affairs to expand the Rural Access Network for Growth Enhancement Program of the Department of Veterans Affairs, and to direct the Comptroller General of the United States to conduct a study to assess certain mental health care resources of the Department of Veterans Affairs available to veterans who live in rural areas.	Pub. L. 117–21 (text) (PDF), H.R. 2441, 135 Stat. 292, enacted June 30, 2021
117-22	June 30, 2021	(No short title)	Providing for congressional disapproval under chapter 8 of title 5, United States Code, of the rule submitted by the Equal Employment Opportunity Commission relating to "Update of Commission's Conciliation Procedures".	Pub. L. 117–22 (text) (PDF), S.J.Res. 13, 135 Stat. 294, enacted June 30, 2021
117-23	June 30, 2021	(No short title)	Providing for congressional disapproval under chapter 8 of title 5, United States Code, of the rule submitted by the Environmental Protection Agency relating to "Oil and Natural Gas Sector: Emission Standards for New, Reconstructed, and Modified Sources Review".	Pub. L. 117–23 (text) (PDF), S.J.Res. 14, 135 Stat. 295, enacted June 30, 2021
117-24	June 30, 2021	(No short title)	Providing for congressional disapproval under chapter 8 of title 5, United States Code, of the rule submitted by the Office of the Comptroller of Currency relating to "National Banks and Federal Savings Associations as Lenders".	Pub. L. 117–24 (text) (PDF), S.J.Res. 15, 135 Stat. 296, enacted June 30, 2021
117-25	July 6, 2021	(No short title)	To provide for the availability of amounts for customer education initiatives and non-awards expenses of the Commodity Futures Trading Commission Whistleblower Program, and for other purposes.	Pub. L. 117–25 (text) (PDF), S. 409, 135 Stat. 297, enacted July 6, 2021
117-26	July 6, 2021	(No short title)	To amend title 28, United States Code, to redefine the eastern and middle judicial districts of North Carolina.	Pub. L. 117–26 (text) (PDF), S. 1340, 135 Stat. 299, enacted July 6, 2021
117-27	July 22, 2021	VOCA Fix to Sustain the Crime Victims Fund Act of 2021	To deposit certain funds into the Crime Victims Fund, to waive matching requirements, and for other purposes.	Pub. L. 117–27 (text) (PDF), H.R. 1652, 135 Stat. 301, enacted July 22, 2021
117-28	July 26, 2021	Construction Consensus Procurement Improvement Act of 2021	To amend the Consolidated Appropriations Act, 2021, to correct a provision on the prohibition on the use of a reverse auction, and for other purposes.	Pub. L. 117–28 (text) (PDF), H.R. 26, 135 Stat. 304, enacted July 26, 2021
117-29	July 29, 2021	(No short title)	To direct the Secretary of Veterans Affairs to ensure that certain medical facilities of the Department of Veterans Affairs have physical locations for the disposal of controlled substances medications.	Pub. L. 117–29 (text) (PDF), S. 957, 135 Stat. 306, enacted July 29, 2021
117-30	July 29, 2021	Major Medical Facility Authorization Act of 2021	To authorize major medical facility projects of the Department of Veterans Affairs for fiscal year 2021.	Pub. L. 117–30 (text) (PDF), S. 1910, 135 Stat. 307, enacted July 29, 2021
117-31	July 30, 2021	Emergency Security Supplemental Appropriations Act, 2021	Making emergency supplemental appropriations for the fiscal year ending September 30, 2021, and for other purposes.	Pub. L. 117–31 (text) (PDF), H.R. 3237, 135 Stat. 309, enacted July 30, 2021
117-32	August 5, 2021	(No short title)	To award four congressional gold medals to the United States Capitol Police and those who protected the U.S. Capitol on January 6, 2021.	Pub. L. 117–32 (text) (PDF), H.R. 3325, 135 Stat. 322, enacted August 5, 2021
117-33	August 6, 2021	(No short title)	To designate the facility of the United States Postal Service located at 500 West Main Street, Suite 102 in Tupelo, Mississippi, as the "Colonel Carlyle 'Smitty' Harris Post Office".	Pub. L. 117–33 (text) (PDF), H.R. 208, 135 Stat. 325, enacted August 6, 2021
117-34	August 6, 2021	(No short title)	To designate the facility of the United States Postal Service located at 1101 Charlotte Street in Georgetown, South Carolina, as the "Joseph Hayne Rainey Memorial Post Office Building".	Pub. L. 117–34 (text) (PDF), H.R. 264, 135 Stat. 326, enacted August 6, 2021
117-35	August 6, 2021	(No short title)	To designate the facility of the United States Postal Service located at 229 Minnetonka Avenue South in Wayzata, Minnesota, as the "Jim Ramstad Post Office".	Pub. L. 117–35 (text) (PDF), H.R. 772, 135 Stat. 327, enacted August 6, 2021
117-36	August 6, 2021	Debarment Enforcement of Bad Actor Registrants (DEBAR) Act of 2021	To amend the Controlled Substances Act to authorize the debarment of certain registrants, and for other purposes.	Pub. L. 117–36 (text) (PDF), H.R. 1002, 135 Stat. 328, enacted August 6, 2021
117-37	August 25, 2021	Puppies Assisting Wounded Servicemembers (PAWS) for Veterans Therapy Act	To direct the Secretary of Veterans Affairs to carry out a pilot program on dog training therapy, and to amend title 38, United States Code, to authorize the Secretary of Veterans Affairs to provide service dogs to veterans with mental illnesses who do not have mobility impairments.	Pub. L. 117–37 (text) (PDF), H.R. 1448, 135 Stat. 329, enacted August 25, 2021
117-38	August 25, 2021	Harlem Hellfighters Congressional Gold Medal Act	To award a Congressional gold medal to the 369th Infantry Regiment, commonly known as the "Harlem Hellfighters", in recognition of their bravery and outstanding service during World War I.	Pub. L. 117–38 (text) (PDF), H.R. 3642, 135 Stat. 333, enacted August 25, 2021
117-39	August 31, 2021	Emergency Repatriation Assistance for Returning Americans Act	To amend section 1113 of the Social Security Act to provide authority for increased payments for temporary assistance to United States citizens returned from foreign countries, and for other purposes.	Pub. L. 117–39 (text) (PDF), H.R. 5085, 135 Stat. 336, enacted August 31, 2021
117-40	September 24, 2021	Congressional Budget Justification Transparency Act of 2021	To amend the Federal Funding Accountability and Transparency Act of 2006, to require the budget justifications and appropriation requests of agencies be made publicly available.	Pub. L. 117–40 (text) (PDF), S. 272, 135 Stat. 337, enacted September 24, 2021
117-41	September 24, 2021	(No short title)	To amend the Alyce Spotted Bear and Walter Soboleff Commission on Native Children Act to extend the deadline for a report by the Alyce Spotted Bear and Walter Soboleff Commission on Native Children, and for other purposes.	Pub. L. 117–41 (text) (PDF), S. 325, 135 Stat. 341, enacted September 24, 2021
117-42	September 30, 2021	Department of Veterans Affairs Expiring Authorities Act of 2021	To amend title 38, United States Code, to extend and modify certain authorities and requirements relating to the Department of Veterans Affairs, and for other purposes.	Pub. L. 117–42 (text) (PDF), H.R. 5293, 135 Stat. 342, enacted September 30, 2021
117-43	September 30, 2021	Extending Government Funding and Delivering Emergency Assistance Act	Making continuing appropriations for the fiscal year ending September 30, 2022, and for providing emergency assistance, and for other purposes.	Pub. L. 117–43 (text) (PDF), H.R. 5305, 135 Stat. 344, enacted September 30, 2021
117-44	October 2, 2021	Surface Transportation Extension Act of 2021	To provide an extension of Federal-aid highway, highway safety, and transit programs, and for other purposes.	Pub. L. 117–44 (text) (PDF), H.R. 5434, 135 Stat. 382, enacted October 2, 2021
117-45	October 8, 2021	Veterans' Compensation Cost-of-Living Adjustment Act of 2021	To increase, effective as of December 1, 2021, the rates of compensation for veterans with service-connected disabilities and the rates of dependency and indemnity compensation for the survivors of certain disabled veterans, and for other purposes.	Pub. L. 117–45 (text) (PDF), S. 189, 135 Stat. 389, enacted October 8, 2021
117-46	October 8, 2021	Helping American Victims Afflicted by Neurological Attacks (HAVANA) Act of 2021	To amend the Central Intelligence Agency Act of 1949 to authorize the provision of payment to personnel of the Central Intelligence Agency who incur qualifying injuries to the brain, to authorize the provision of payment to personnel of the Department of State who incur similar injuries, and for other purposes.	Pub. L. 117–46 (text) (PDF), S. 1828, 135 Stat. 391, enacted October 8, 2021
117-47	October 8, 2021	K-12 Cybersecurity Act of 2021	To establish a K–12 education cybersecurity initiative, and for other purposes.	Pub. L. 117–47 (text) (PDF), S. 1917, 135 Stat. 397, enacted October 8, 2021
117-48	October 13, 2021	(No short title)	To designate the September 11th National Memorial Trail Route, and for other purposes.	Pub. L. 117–49 (text) (PDF), H.R. 2278, 135 Stat. 400, enacted October 13, 2021
117-49	October 13, 2021	Consider Teachers Act of 2021	To amend the Higher Education Act of 1965 in order to improve the service obligation verification process for TEACH Grant recipients, and for other purposes.	Pub. L. 117–49 (text) (PDF), S. 848, 135 Stat. 402, enacted October 13, 2021
117-50	October 14, 2021	(No short title)	To provide for the publication by the Secretary of Health and Human Services of physical activity recommendations for Americans. (Note: Despite what the official title suggests, the bill has nothing to do with physical activity, and actually raises the debt limit by $480 billion.)	Pub. L. 117–50 (text) (PDF), S. 1301, 135 Stat. 407, enacted October 14, 2021
117-51	October 19, 2021	(No short title)	To amend the Fentanyl Sanctions Act, to modify certain deadlines relating to the Commission on Combating Synthetic Opioid Trafficking.	Pub. L. 117–51 (text) (PDF), H.R. 4981, 135 Stat. 408, enacted October 19, 2021
117-52	October 31, 2021	Further Surface Transportation Extension Act of 2021	To provide an extension of Federal-aid highway, highway safety, and transit programs, and for other purposes.	Pub. L. 117–52 (text) (PDF), H.R. 5763, 135 Stat. 409, enacted October 31, 2021
117-53	November 10, 2021	Ensuring Compliance Against Drug Diversion Act of 2021	To amend the Controlled Substances Act to provide for the modification, transfer, and termination of a registration to manufacture, distribute, or dispense controlled substances or list I chemicals, and for other purposes.	Pub. L. 117–53 (text) (PDF), H.R. 1899, 135 Stat. 411, enacted November 10, 2021
117-54	November 10, 2021	Reinforcing Nicaragua's Adherence to Conditions for Electoral Reform (RENACER) Act of 2021	To advance the strategic alignment of United States diplomatic tools toward the realization of free, fair, and transparent elections in Nicaragua and to reaffirm the commitment of the United States to protect the fundamental freedoms and human rights of the people of Nicaragua, and for other purposes.	Pub. L. 117–54 (text) (PDF), S. 1064, 135 Stat. 413, enacted November 10, 2021
117-55	November 11, 2021	Secure Equipment Act of 2021	To ensure that the Federal Communications Commission prohibits authorization of radio frequency devices that pose a national security risk.	Pub. L. 117–55 (text) (PDF), H.R. 3919, 135 Stat. 423, enacted November 11, 2021
117-56	November 12, 2021	(No short title)	To name the Department of Veterans Affairs community-based outpatient clinic in Columbus, Georgia, as the "Robert S. Poydasheff VA Clinic."	Pub. L. 117–56 (text) (PDF), H.R. 3475, 135 Stat. 425, enacted November 12, 2021
117-57	November 12, 2021	(No short title)	To name the Department of Veterans Affairs community-based outpatient clinic in Aurora, Colorado, as the "Lieutenant Colonel John W. Mosley VA Clinic."	Pub. L. 117–57 (text) (PDF), H.R. 4172, 135 Stat. 427, enacted November 12, 2021
117-58	November 15, 2021	Infrastructure Investment and Jobs Act	To authorize funds for Federal-aid highways, highway safety programs, and transit programs, and for other purposes.	Pub. L. 117–58 (text) (PDF), H.R. 3684, 135 Stat. 429, enacted November 15, 2021
117-59	November 18, 2021	Jaime Zapata and Victor Avila Federal Officers and Employees Protection Act	To amend title 18, United States Code, to further protect officers and employees of the United States, and for other purposes.	Pub. L. 117–59 (text) (PDF), S. 921, 135 Stat. 1468, enacted November 18, 2021
117-60	November 18, 2021	Confidentiality Opportunities for Peer Support Counseling Act	To make Federal law enforcement officer peer support communications confidential, and for other purposes.	Pub. L. 117–60 (text) (PDF), S. 1502, 135 Stat. 1470, enacted November 18, 2021
117-61	November 18, 2021	Protecting America's First Responders Act of 2021	To amend the Omnibus Crime Control and Safe Streets Act of 1968 with respect to payments to certain public safety officers who have become permanently and totally disabled as a result of personal injuries sustained in the line of duty, and for other purposes.	Pub. L. 117–61 (text) (PDF), S. 1511, 135 Stat. 1474, enacted November 18, 2021
117-62	November 22, 2021	Veterans and Family Information Act	To direct the Secretary of Veterans Affairs to make all fact sheets of the Department of Veterans Affairs available in English, Spanish, and Tagalog, and other commonly spoken languages, and for other purposes.	Pub. L. 117–62 (text) (PDF), H.R. 2093, 135 Stat. 1482, enacted November 22, 2021
117-63	November 22, 2021	VA Transparency & Trust Act of 2021	To direct the Secretary of Veterans Affairs to submit to Congress a plan for obligating and expending Coronavirus pandemic funding made available to the Department of Veterans Affairs, and for other purposes.	Pub. L. 117–63 (text) (PDF), H.R. 2911, 135 Stat. 1484, enacted November 22, 2021
117-64	November 23, 2021	(No short title)	To direct the Secretary of Veterans Affairs to submit to Congress a report on the use of cameras in medical facilities of the Department of Veterans Affairs.	Pub. L. 117–64 (text) (PDF), H.R. 1510, 135 Stat. 1486, enacted November 23, 2021
117-65	November 23, 2021	(No short title)	To authorize the Seminole Tribe of Florida to lease or transfer certain land, and for other purposes.	Pub. L. 117–65 (text) (PDF), S. 108, 135 Stat. 1488, enacted November 23, 2021
117-66	November 30, 2021	(No short title)	To require the Comptroller General of the United States to conduct a study on disparities associated with race and ethnicity with respect to certain benefits administered by the Secretary of Veterans Affairs, and for other purposes.	Pub. L. 117–66 (text) (PDF), S. 1031, 135 Stat. 1489, enacted November 30, 2021
117-67	November 30, 2021	Hire Veteran Health Heroes Act of 2021	To identify and refer members of the Armed Forces with a health care occupation who are separating from the Armed Forces for potential employment with the Department of Veterans Affairs, and for other purposes.	Pub. L. 117–67 (text) (PDF), S. 894, 135 Stat. 1491, enacted November 30, 2021
117-68	November 30, 2021	Colonel John M. McHugh Tuition Fairness for Survivors Act of 2021	To amend title 38, United States Code, to provide for the disapproval by the Secretary of Veterans Affairs of courses of education offered by public institutions of higher learning that do not charge veterans the in-State tuition rate for purposes of Survivors’ and Dependents’ Educational Assistance Program, and for other purposes.	Pub. L. 117–68 (text) (PDF), S. 1095, 135 Stat. 1493, enacted November 30, 2021
117-69	November 30, 2021	Protecting Moms Who Served Act of 2021	To codify maternity care coordination programs at the Department of Veterans Affairs, and for other purposes.	Pub. L. 117–69 (text) (PDF), S. 796, 135 Stat. 1495, enacted November 30, 2021
117-70	December 3, 2021	Further Extending Government Funding Act	Making further continuing appropriations for the fiscal year ending September 30, 2022, and for other purposes.	Pub. L. 117–70 (text) (PDF), H.R. 6119, 135 Stat. 1499, enacted December 3, 2021
117-71	December 10, 2021	Protecting Medicare and American Farmers from Sequester Cuts Act	To address behavioral health and well-being among health care professionals.	Pub. L. 117–71 (text) (PDF), S. 610, 135 Stat. 1506, enacted December 10, 2021
117-72	December 16, 2021	(No short title)	To award posthumously a Congressional Gold Medal, in commemoration to the servicemembers who perished in Afghanistan on August 26, 2021, during the evacuation of citizens of the United States and Afghan allies at Hamid Karzai International Airport, and for other purposes.	Pub. L. 117–72 (text) (PDF), H.R. 5142, 135 Stat. 1511, enacted December 16, 2021
117-73	December 16, 2021	(No short title)	Joint resolution relating to increasing the debt limit.	Pub. L. 117–73 (text) (PDF), S.J.Res. 33, 135 Stat. 1514, enacted December 16, 2021
117-74	December 21, 2021	(No short title)	To redesignate the Federal building located at 167 North Main Street in Memphis, Tennessee, as the "Odell Horton Federal Building."	Pub. L. 117–74 (text) (PDF), H.R. 390, 135 Stat. 1515, enacted December 21, 2021
117-75	December 21, 2021	(No short title)	To designate the Federal Building and United States Courthouse located at 1125 Chapline Street in Wheeling, West Virginia, as the "Frederick P. Stamp, Jr. Federal Building and United States Courthouse."	Pub. L. 117–75 (text) (PDF), H.R. 4660, 135 Stat. 1516, enacted December 21, 2021
117-76	December 21, 2021	Responsible Education Mitigating Options and Technical Extensions (REMOTE) Act	To extend certain expiring provisions of law relating to benefits provided under Department of Veterans Affairs educational assistance programs during COVID-19 pandemic, and for other purposes.	Pub. L. 117–76 (text) (PDF), H.R. 5545, 135 Stat. 1517, enacted December 21, 2021
117-77	December 22, 2021	Capitol Police Emergency Assistance Act of 2021	To empower the Chief of the United States Capitol Police to unilaterally request the assistance of the DC National Guard or Federal law enforcement agencies in emergencies without prior approval of the Capitol Police Board.	Pub. L. 117–77 (text) (PDF), S. 3377, 135 Stat. 1522, enacted December 22, 2021
117-78	December 23, 2021	(No short title) (Note: Formerly and commonly known as the Uyghur Forced Labor Prevention Act.)	To ensure that goods made with forced labor in the Xinjiang Uyghur Autonomous Region of the People's Republic of China do not enter the United States market, and for other purposes.	Pub. L. 117–78 (text) (PDF), H.R. 6256, 135 Stat. 1525, enacted December 23, 2021
117-79	December 23, 2021	Accelerating Access to Critical Therapies for ALS Act	To direct the Secretary of Health and Human Services to support research on, and expanded access to, investigational drugs for amyotrophic lateral sclerosis, and for other purposes.	Pub. L. 117–79 (text) (PDF), H.R. 3537, 135 Stat. 1533, enacted December 23, 2021
117-80	December 27, 2021	(No short title)	To authorize the National Medal of Honor Museum Foundation to establish a commemorative work in the District of Columbia and its environs, and for other purposes.	Pub. L. 117–80 (text) (PDF), H.R. 1664, 135 Stat. 1539, enacted December 27, 2021
117-81	December 27, 2021	National Defense Authorization Act for Fiscal Year 2022	To authorize appropriations for fiscal year 2022 for military activities of the Department of Defense, for military construction, and for defense activities of the Department of Energy, to prescribe military personnel strengths for such fiscal year, and for other purposes.	Pub. L. 117–81 (text) (PDF), S. 1605, 135 Stat. 1541, enacted December 27, 2021
117-82	January 20, 2022	Puerto Rico Recovery Accuracy in Disclosures Act of 2021 (PRRADA)	To impose requirements on the payment of compensation to professional persons employed in voluntary cases commenced under title III of the Puerto Rico Oversight Management and Economic Stability Act (commonly known as "PROMESA").	Pub. L. 117–82 (text) (PDF), H.R. 1192, 136 Stat. 3, enacted January 20, 2022
117-83	January 21, 2022	Supplemental Impact Aid Flexibility Act	To provide that, due to the disruptions caused by COVID-19, applications for impact aid funding for fiscal year 2023 may use certain data submitted in the fiscal year 2022 application.	Pub. L. 117–83 (text) (PDF), S. 2959, 136 Stat. 6, enacted January 21, 2022
117-84	January 31, 2022	Willie O'Ree Congressional Gold Medal Act	To award a Congressional Gold Medal to Willie O'Ree, in recognition of his extraordinary contributions and commitment to hockey, inclusion, and recreational opportunity.	Pub. L. 117–84 (text) (PDF), S. 452, 136 Stat. 8, enacted January 31, 2022
117-85	February 1, 2022	Ghost Army Congressional Gold Medal Act	To award a Congressional Gold Medal to the 23d Headquarters Special Troops and the 3133d Signal Service Company, popularly known as the "Ghost Army", in recognition of their unique and highly distinguished service in conducting deception operations in Europe during World War II.	Pub. L. 117–85 (text) (PDF), S. 1404, 136 Stat. 11, enacted February 1, 2022
117-86	February 18, 2022	Further Additional Extending Government Funding Act	Making further continuing appropriations for the fiscal year ending September 30, 2022, and for other purposes.	Pub. L. 117–86 (text) (PDF), H.R. 6617, 136 Stat. 15, enacted February 18, 2022
117-87	February 22, 2022	(No short title)	To designate the facility of the United States Postal Service located at 42 Main Street in Slatersville, Rhode Island, as the "Specialist Matthew R. Turcotte Post Office".	Pub. L. 117–87 (text) (PDF), S. 566, 136 Stat. 19, enacted February 22, 2022
117-88	February 22, 2022	Promoting Rigorous and Innovative Cost Efficiencies for Federal Procurement and Acquisitions Act (PRICE Act) of 2021	To promote innovative acquisition techniques and procurement strategies, and for other purposes.	Pub. L. 117–88 (text) (PDF), S. 583, 136 Stat. 20, enacted February 22, 2022
117-89	February 23, 2022	(No short title)	To name the Department of Veterans Affairs community-based outpatient clinic in Gaylord, Michigan, as the "Navy Corpsman Steve Andrews Department of Veterans Affairs Health Care Clinic".	Pub. L. 117–89 (text) (PDF), H.R. 1281, 136 Stat. 25, enacted February 23, 2022
117-90	March 3, 2022	Ending Forced Arbitration of Sexual Assault and Sexual Harassment Act of 2021	To amend title 9 of the United States Code with respect to arbitration of disputes involving sexual assault and sexual harassment.	Pub. L. 117–90 (text) (PDF), H.R. 4445, 136 Stat. 26, enacted March 3, 2022
117-91	March 10, 2022	(No short title)	To designate the facility of the United States Postal Service located at 17 East Main Street in Herington, Kansas, as the "Captain Emil J. Kapaun Post Office Building".	Pub. L. 117–91 (text) (PDF), H.R. 2044, 136 Stat. 29, enacted March 10, 2022
117-92	March 10, 2022	(No short title)	To designate the facility of the United States Postal Service located at 1905 15th Street in Boulder, Colorado, as the "Officer Eric H. Talley Post Office Building".	Pub. L. 117–92 (text) (PDF), H.R. 3210, 136 Stat. 30, enacted March 10, 2022
117-93	March 11, 2022	(No short title)	To designate the facility of the United States Postal Service located at 3493 Burnet Avenue in Cincinnati, Ohio, as the "John H. Leahr and Herbert M. Heilbrun Post Office".	Pub. L. 117–93 (text) (PDF), H.R. 960, 136 Stat. 31, enacted March 11, 2022
117-94	March 11, 2022	(No short title)	To designate the facility of the United States Postal Service located at 66 Meserole Avenue in Brooklyn, New York, as the "Joseph R. Lentol Post Office".	Pub. L. 117–94 (text) (PDF), H.R. 3419, 136 Stat. 32, enacted March 11, 2022
117-95	March 11, 2022	Extension of Continuing Appropriations Act, 2022	Making further continuing appropriations for the fiscal year ending September 30, 2022, and for other purposes.	Pub. L. 117–95 (text) (PDF), H.J.Res. 75, 136 Stat. 33, enacted March 11, 2022
117-96	March 14, 2022	(No short title)	To amend title 38, United States Code, to clarify the role of doctors of podiatric medicine in the Department of Veterans Affairs, and for other purposes.	Pub. L. 117–96 (text) (PDF), H.R. 2545, 136 Stat. 34, enacted March 14, 2022
117-97	March 14, 2022	'Six Triple Eight' Congressional Gold Medal Act of 2021	To award a Congressional Gold Medal to the members of the Women's Army Corps who were assigned to the 6888th Central Postal Directory Battalion, known as the "Six Triple Eight".	Pub. L. 117–97 (text) (PDF), S. 321, 136 Stat. 36, enacted March 14, 2022
117-98	March 14, 2022	(No short title)	To designate the medical center of the Department of Veterans Affairs in San Diego, California, as the "Jennifer Moreno Department of Veterans Affairs Medical Center", and to support the designation of a component of such medical center in honor of Kathleen Bruyere.	Pub. L. 117–98 (text) (PDF), H.R. 3665, 136 Stat. 40, enacted March 14, 2022
117-99	March 14, 2022	Methamphetamine Response Act of 2021	To designate methamphetamine as an emerging threat, and for other purposes.	Pub. L. 117–99 (text) (PDF), S. 854, 136 Stat. 43, enacted March 14, 2022
117-100	March 15, 2022	Suicide Training and Awareness Nationally Delivered for Universal Prevention Act of 2021	To amend the Public Health Service Act to provide best practices on student suicide awareness and prevention training and condition State educational agencies, local educational agencies, and tribal educational agencies receiving funds under section 520A of such Act to establish and implement a school-based student suicide awareness and prevention training policy.	Pub. L. 117–100 (text) (PDF), S. 1543, 136 Stat. 44, enacted March 15, 2022
117-101	March 15, 2022	Supporting the Foundation for the National Institutes of Health and the Reagan-Udall Foundation for the Food and Drug Administration Act	To increase funding for the Reagan-Udall Foundation for the Food and Drug Administration and for the Foundation for the National Institutes of Health.	Pub. L. 117–101 (text) (PDF), S. 1662, 136 Stat. 47, enacted March 15, 2022
117-102	March 15, 2022	(No short title)	To provide for the application of certain provisions of the Secure Rural Schools and Community Self-Determination Act of 2000 for fiscal year 2021.	Pub. L. 117–102 (text) (PDF), S. 3706, 136 Stat. 48, enacted March 15, 2022
117-103	March 15, 2022	Consolidated Appropriations Act, 2022	Making consolidated appropriations for the fiscal year ending September 30, 2022, and for providing emergency assistance for the situation in Ukraine, and for other purposes.	Pub. L. 117–103 (text) (PDF), H.R. 2471, 136 Stat. 49, enacted March 15, 2022
117-104	March 18, 2022	John Lewis NIMHD Research Endowment Revitalization Act of 2021	To amend the Public Health Service Act to provide that the authority of the Director of the National Institute on Minority Health and Health Disparities to make certain research endowments applies with respect to both current and former centers of excellence, and for other purposes.	Pub. L. 117–104 (text) (PDF), H.R. 189, 136 Stat. 1117, enacted March 18, 2022
117-105	March 18, 2022	Dr. Lorna Breen Health Care Provider Protection Act	To address behavioral health and well-being among health care professionals.	Pub. L. 117–105 (text) (PDF), H.R. 1667, 136 Stat. 1118, enacted March 18, 2022
117-106	March 18, 2022	Amache National Historic Site Act	To establish the Amache National Historic Site in the State of Colorado as a Unit of the National Park System, and for other purposes.	Pub. L. 117–106 (text) (PDF), H.R. 2497, 136 Stat. 1122, enacted March 18, 2022
117-107	March 29, 2022	Emmett Till Antilynching Act	To amend section 249 of title 18, United States Code, to specify lynching as a hate crime act.	Pub. L. 117–107 (text) (PDF), H.R. 55, 136 Stat. 1125, enacted March 29, 2022
117-108	April 6, 2022	Postal Service Reform Act of 2022	To provide stability to and enhance the services of the United States Postal Service, and for other purposes.	Pub. L. 117–108 (text) (PDF), H.R. 3076, 136 Stat. 1127, enacted April 6, 2022
117-109	April 8, 2022	Ending Importation of Russian Oil Act	To prohibit the importation of energy products of the Russian Federation, and for other purposes.	Pub. L. 117–109 (text) (PDF), H.R. 6968, 136 Stat. 1154, enacted April 8, 2022
117-110	April 8, 2022	Suspending Normal Trade Relations with Russia and Belarus Act	To suspend normal trade relations treatment for the Russian Federation and the Republic of Belarus, and for other purposes.	Pub. L. 117–110 (text) (PDF), H.R. 7108, 136 Stat. 1159, enacted April 8, 2022
117-111	April 13, 2022	(No short title)	To obtain and direct the placement in the Capitol or on the Capitol Grounds of a statue to honor Associate Justice of the Supreme Court of the United States Sandra Day O'Connor and a statue to honor Associate Justice of the Supreme Court of the United States Ruth Bader Ginsburg.	Pub. L. 117–111 (text) (PDF), S. 3294, 136 Stat. 1166, enacted April 13, 2022
117-112	April 19, 2022	Save the Liberty Theatre Act of 2021	To direct the Secretary of the Interior to convey to the City of Eunice, Louisiana, certain Federal land in Louisiana, and for other purposes.	Pub. L. 117–112 (text) (PDF), H.R. 3197, 136 Stat. 1171, enacted April 19, 2022
117-113	April 19, 2022	Shadow Wolves Enhancement Act	To authorize the reclassification of the tactical enforcement officers (commonly known as the "Shadow Wolves") in the Homeland Security Investigations tactical patrol unit operating on the lands of the Tohono O'odham Nation as special agents, and for other purposes.	Pub. L. 117–113 (text) (PDF), H.R. 5681, 136 Stat. 1173, enacted April 19, 2022
117-114	April 29, 2022	Modernizing Access to Our Public Land Act	To require the Secretary of the Interior, the Secretary of Agriculture, and the Assistant Secretary of the Army for Civil Works to digitize and make publicly available geographic information system mapping data relating to public access to Federal land and waters for outdoor recreation, and for other purposes.	
117-115	May 5, 2022	Donna M. Doss Memorial Act of 2021	To designate the Rocksprings Station of the U.S. Border Patrol located on West Main Street in Rocksprings, Texas, as the "Donna M. Doss Border Patrol Station."	Pub. L. 117–115 (text) (PDF), S. 233, 136 Stat. 1178, enacted May 5, 2022
117-116	May 5, 2022	Better Cybercrime Metrics Act	To establish cybercrime reporting mechanisms, and for other purposes.	Pub. L. 117–116 (text) (PDF), S. 2629, 136 Stat. 1180, enacted May 5, 2022
117-117	May 6, 2022	William T. Coleman, Jr. and Norman Y. Mineta Department of Transportation Headquarters Act	To designate the headquarters building of the Department of Transportation located at 1200 New Jersey Avenue, SE, in Washington, DC, as the "William T. Coleman, Jr. [sic], Federal Building".	Pub. L. 117–117 (text) (PDF), S. 400, 136 Stat. 1183, enacted May 6, 2022
117-118	May 9, 2022	Ukraine Democracy Defense Lend-Lease Act of 2022	To provide enhanced authority for the President to enter into agreements with the Government of Ukraine to lend or lease defense articles to that Government to protect civilian populations in Ukraine from Russian military invasion, and for other purposes.	Pub. L. 117–118 (text) (PDF), S. 3522, 136 Stat. 1184, enacted May 9, 2022
117-119	May 10, 2022	(No short title)	To designate the United States courthouse located at 1501 North 6th Street in Harrisburg, Pennsylvania, as the "Sylvia H. Rambo United States Courthouse," and for other purposes.	Pub. L. 117–119 (text) (PDF), S. 1226, 136 Stat. 1186, enacted May 10, 2022
117-120	May 10, 2022	(No short title)	To designate the Federal Office Building located at 308 W. 21st Street in Cheyenne, Wyoming, as the "Louisa Swain Federal Office Building," and for other purposes.	Pub. L. 117–120 (text) (PDF), S. 2126, 136 Stat. 1187, enacted May 10, 2022
117-121	May 12, 2022	American Fisheries Advisory Committee Act	To establish the American Fisheries Advisory Committee to assist in the awarding of fisheries research and development grants, and for other purposes.	Pub. L. 117–121 (text) (PDF), S. 658, 136 Stat. 1188, enacted May 12, 2022
117-122	May 12, 2022	National Cybersecurity Preparedness Consortium Act of 2021	To authorize the Secretary of Homeland Security to work with cybersecurity consortia for training, and for other purposes.	Pub. L. 117–122 (text) (PDF), S. 497, 136 Stat. 1193, enacted May 12, 2022
117-123	May 12, 2022	Brown v. Board of Education National Historical Park Expansion and Redesignation Act	To amend the Act entitled "Act to provide for the establishment of the Brown v. Board of Education National Historic Site in the State of Kansas, and for other purposes" to provide for inclusion of additional related sites in the National Park System, and for other purposes.	Pub. L. 117–123 (text) (PDF), S. 270, 136 Stat. 1196, enacted May 12, 2022
117-124	May 13, 2022	(No short title)	To direct the Secretary of State to develop a strategy to regain observer status for Taiwan in the World Health Organization, and for other purposes.	Pub. L. 117–124 (text) (PDF), S. 812, 136 Stat. 1202, enacted May 13, 2022
117-125	May 13, 2022	Courthouse Ethics and Transparency Act	To amend the Ethics in Government Act of 1978 to provide for a periodic transaction reporting requirement for Federal judicial officers and the online publication of financial disclosure reports of Federal judicial officers, and for other purposes.	Pub. L. 117–125 (text) (PDF), S. 3059, 136 Stat. 1205, enacted May 13, 2022
117-126	May 16, 2022	Safe Sleep for Babies Act of 2021	To provide that inclined sleepers for infants and crib bumpers shall be considered banned hazardous products under section 8 of the Consumer Product Safety Act, and for other purposes.	Pub. L. 117–126 (text) (PDF), H.R. 3182, 136 Stat. 1208, enacted May 16, 2022
117-127	May 16, 2022	Multinational Species Conservation Funds Semipostal Stamp Reauthorization Act of 2021	To require the United States Postal Service to continue selling the Multinational Species Conservation Funds Semipostal Stamp until all remaining stamps are sold, and for other purposes.	Pub. L. 117–127 (text) (PDF), H.R. 6023, 136 Stat. 1209, enacted May 16, 2022
117-128	May 21, 2022	Additional Ukraine Supplemental Appropriations Act, 2022	Making emergency supplemental appropriations for assistance for the situation in Ukraine for the fiscal year ending September 30, 2022, and for other purposes.	Pub. L. 117–128 (text) (PDF), H.R. 7691, 136 Stat. 1211, enacted May 21, 2022
117-129	May 21, 2022	Access to Baby Formula Act of 2022	To amend the Child Nutrition Act of 1966 to establish waiver authority to address certain emergencies, disasters, and supply chain disruptions, and for other purposes.	Pub. L. 117–129 (text) (PDF), H.R. 7791, 136 Stat. 1225, enacted May 21, 2022
117-130	June 6, 2022	Homeland Security for Children Act	To amend the Homeland Security Act of 2002 to ensure that the needs of children are considered in homeland security planning, and for other purposes.	Pub. L. 117–130 (text) (PDF), H.R. 4426, 136 Stat. 1229, enacted June 6, 2022
117-131	June 7, 2022	(No short title)	To designate the community-based outpatient clinic of the Department of Veterans Affairs planned to be built in Oahu, Hawaii, as the "Daniel Kahikina Akaka Department of Veterans Affairs Community-Based Outpatient Clinic".	Pub. L. 117–131 (text) (PDF), S. 1760, 136 Stat. 1231, enacted June 7, 2022
117-132	June 7, 2022	United States Army Rangers Veterans of World War II Congressional Gold Medal Act	To award a Congressional Gold Medal, collectively, to the United States Army Rangers Veterans of World War II in recognition of their extraordinary service during World War II.	Pub. L. 117–132 (text) (PDF), S. 1872, 136 Stat. 1232, enacted June 7, 2022
117-133	June 7, 2022	Dr. Kate Hendricks Thomas Supporting Expanded Review for Veterans In Combat Environments Act	To amend title 38, United States Code, to direct the Under Secretary for Health of the Department of Veterans Affairs to provide mammography screening for veterans who served in locations associated with toxic exposure.	Pub. L. 117–133 (text) (PDF), S. 2102, 136 Stat. 1238, enacted June 7, 2022
117-134	June 7, 2022	(No short title)	To rename the Provo Veterans Center in Orem, Utah, as the "Col. Gail S. Halvorsen 'Candy Bomber' Veterans Center".	Pub. L. 117–134 (text) (PDF), S. 2514, 136 Stat. 1241, enacted June 7, 2022
117-135	June 7, 2022	Making Advances in Mammography and Medical Options for Veterans Act	To improve mammography services furnished by the Department of Veterans Affairs, and for other purposes.	Pub. L. 117–135 (text) (PDF), S. 2533, 136 Stat. 1244, enacted June 7, 2022
117-136	June 7, 2022	Strengthening Oversight for Veterans Act of 2021	To provide the Inspector General of the Department of Veterans Affairs testimonial subpoena authority, and for other purposes.	Pub. L. 117–136 (text) (PDF), S. 2687, 136 Stat. 1251, enacted June 7, 2022
117-137	June 7, 2022	(No short title)	To amend title 38, United States Code, to authorize the Secretary of Veterans Affairs to transfer the name of property of the Department of Veterans Affairs designated by law to other property of the Department.	Pub. L. 117–137 (text) (PDF), S. 3527, 136 Stat. 1254, enacted June 7, 2022
117-138	June 7, 2022	Veterans Rapid Retraining Assistance Program Restoration and Recovery Act of 2022	To restore entitlement to educational assistance under Veterans Rapid Retraining Program in cases of a closure of an educational institution or a disapproval of a program of education, and for other purposes.	Pub. L. 117–138 (text) (PDF), S. 4089, 136 Stat. 1256, enacted June 7, 2022
117-139	June 7, 2022	RECA Extension Act of 2022	To reauthorize the Radiation Exposure Compensation Act.	Pub. L. 117–139 (text) (PDF), S. 4119, 136 Stat. 1258, enacted June 7, 2022
117-140	June 13, 2022	Commission To Study the Potential Creation of a National Museum of Asian Pacific American History and Culture Act	To establish the Commission to Study the Potential Creation of a National Museum of Asian Pacific American History and Culture, and for other purposes.	Pub. L. 117–140 (text) (PDF), H.R. 3525, 136 Stat. 1259, enacted June 13, 2022
117-141	June 15, 2022	(No short title)	To designate the facility of the United States Postal Service located at 200 East Main Street in Maroa, Illinois, as the "Jeremy L. Ridlen Post Office."	Pub. L. 117–141 (text) (PDF), H.R. 3579, 136 Stat. 1263, enacted June 15, 2022
117-142	June 15, 2022	(No short title)	To designate the facility of the United States Postal Service located at 6223 Maple Street, in Omaha, Nebraska, as the "Petty Officer 1st Class Charles Jackson French Post Office."	Pub. L. 117–142 (text) (PDF), H.R. 4168, 136 Stat. 1264, enacted June 15, 2022
117-143	June 16, 2022	(No short title)	To designate the facility of the United States Postal Service located at 1233 North Cedar Street in Owasso, Oklahoma, as the "Technical Sergeant Marshal Roberts Post Office Building."	Pub. L. 117–143 (text) (PDF), H.R. 1298, 136 Stat. 1265, enacted June 16, 2022
117-144	June 16, 2022	South Florida Clean Coastal Waters Act of 2021	To require the Inter-Agency Task Force on Harmful Algal Blooms and Hypoxia to develop a plan for reducing, mitigating, and controlling harmful algal blooms and hypoxia in South Florida, and for other purposes.	Pub. L. 117–144 (text) (PDF), S. 66, 136 Stat. 1266, enacted June 16, 2022
117-145	June 16, 2022	Supply Chain Security Training Act of 2021	To manage supply chain risk through counterintelligence training, and for other purposes.	Pub. L. 117–145 (text) (PDF), S. 2201, 136 Stat. 1269, enacted June 16, 2022
117-146	June 16, 2022	Ocean Shipping Reform Act of 2022	To amend title 46, United States Code, with respect to prohibited acts by ocean common carriers or marine terminal operators, and for other purposes.	Pub. L. 117–146 (text) (PDF), S. 3580, 136 Stat. 1272, enacted June 16, 2022
117-147	June 16, 2022	(No short title)	To designate the facility of the United States Postal Service located at 202 Trumbull Street in Saint Clair, Michigan, as the "Corporal Jeffrey Robert Standfest Post Office Building".	Pub. L. 117–147 (text) (PDF), H.R. 3613, 136 Stat. 1287, enacted June 16, 2022
117-148	June 16, 2022	Supreme Court Police Parity Act of 2022	To amend title 40, United States Code, to grant the Supreme Court of the United States security-related authorities equivalent to the legislative and executive branches.	Pub. L. 117–148 (text) (PDF), S. 4160, 136 Stat. 1288, enacted June 16, 2022
117-149	June 16, 2022	Federal Rotational Cyber Workforce Program Act of 2021	To establish a Federal rotational cyber workforce program for the Federal cyber workforce.	Pub. L. 117–149 (text) (PDF), S. 1097, 136 Stat. 1289, enacted June 16, 2022
117-150	June 21, 2022	State and Local Government Cybersecurity Act of 2021	To amend the Homeland Security Act of 2002 to provide for engagements with State, local, Tribal, and territorial governments, and for other purposes	Pub. L. 117–150 (text) (PDF), S. 2520, 136 Stat. 1295, enacted June 21, 2022
117-151	June 21, 2022	Bankruptcy Threshold Adjustment and Technical Corrections Act	To amend title 11, United States Code, to modify the eligibility requirements for a debtor under chapter 13, and for other purposes.	Pub. L. 117–151 (text) (PDF), S. 3823, 136 Stat. 1298, enacted June 21, 2022
117-152	June 23, 2022	(No short title)	To designate the facility of the United States Postal Service located at 1 League in Irvine, California, as the "Tuskegee Airman Lieutenant Colonel Robert J. Friend Memorial Post Office Building".	Pub. L. 117–152 (text) (PDF), S. 3823, 136 Stat. 1301, enacted June 23, 2022
117-153	June 23, 2022	(No short title)	To designate the facility of the United States Postal Service located at 2800 South Adams Street in Tallahassee, Florida, as the "D. Edwina Stephens Post Office".	Pub. L. 117–153 (text) (PDF), H.R. 2324, 136 Stat. 1302, enacted June 23, 2022
117-154	June 23, 2022	VA Electronic Health Record Transparency Act of 2021	To direct the Secretary of Veterans Affairs to submit to Congress periodic reports on the costs, performance metrics, and outcomes of the Department of Veterans Affairs Electronic Health Record Modernization program.	Pub. L. 117–154 (text) (PDF), H.R. 4591, 136 Stat. 1303, enacted June 23, 2022
117-155	June 24, 2022	(No short title)	To designate the facility of the United States Postal Service located at 502 East Cotati Avenue in Cotati, California, as the "Arturo L. Ibleto Post Office Building".	Pub. L. 117–155 (text) (PDF), H.R. 735, 136 Stat. 1306, enacted June 24, 2022
117-156	June 24, 2022	(No short title)	To designate the facility of the United States Postal Service located at 40 Fulton Street in Middletown, New York, as the "Benjamin A. Gilman Post Office Building".	Pub. L. 117–156 (text) (PDF), H.R. 767, 136 Stat. 1307, enacted June 24, 2022
117-157	June 24, 2022	(No short title)	To designate the facility of the United States Postal Service located at 132 North Loudoun Street, Suite 1 in Winchester, Virginia, as the "Patsy Cline Post Office".	Pub. L. 117–157 (text) (PDF), H.R. 1444, 136 Stat. 1308, enacted June 24, 2022
117-158	June 25, 2022	Keep Kids Fed Act of 2022	To amend the Families First Coronavirus Response Act to extend child nutrition waiver authority, and for other purposes.	Pub. L. 117–158 (text) (PDF), S. 2089, 136 Stat. 1309, enacted June 25, 2022
117-159	June 25, 2022	Bipartisan Safer Communities Act	To make our communities safer.	Pub. L. 117–159 (text) (PDF), S. 2938, 136 Stat. 1313, enacted June 25, 2022
117-160	July 21, 2022	Formula Act	To amend the Harmonized Tariff Schedule of the United States to suspend temporarily rates of duty on imports of certain infant formula products, and for other purposes.	Pub. L. 117–160 (text) (PDF), H.R. 8351, 136 Stat. 1345, enacted July 21, 2022
117-161	July 29, 2022	Desert Sage Youth Wellness Center Access Improvement Act	To authorize the Secretary of Health and Human Services, acting through the Director of the Indian Health Service, to acquire private land to facilitate access to the Desert Sage Youth Wellness Center in Hemet, California, and for other purposes.	Pub. L. 117–161 (text) (PDF), S. 144, 136 Stat. 1347, enacted July 29, 2022
117-162	August 3, 2022	Greatest Generation Commemorative Coin Act	To require the Secretary of the Treasury to mint coins in commemoration of the National World War II Memorial in Washington, DC, and for other purposes.	Pub. L. 117–162 (text) (PDF), H.R. 1057, 136 Stat. 1349, enacted August 3, 2022
117-163	August 3, 2022	Harriet Tubman Bicentennial Commemorative Coin Act	To require the Secretary of the Treasury to mint commemorative coins in recognition of the Bicentennial of Harriet Tubman's birth.	Pub. L. 117–163 (text) (PDF), H.R. 1842, 136 Stat. 1353, enacted August 3, 2022
117-164	August 3, 2022	Homicide Victims' Families' Rights Act of 2021	To provide for a system for reviewing the case files of cold case murders at the instance of certain persons, and for other purposes.	Pub. L. 117–164 (text) (PDF), H.R. 3359, 136 Stat. 1358, enacted August 3, 2022
117-165	August 5, 2022	COVID-19 EIDL Fraud Statute of Limitations Act of 2022	To extend the statute of limitations for fraud by borrowers under certain COVID-19 economic injury disaster loan programs of the Small Business Administration, and for other purposes.	Pub. L. 117–165 (text) (PDF), H.R. 7334, 136 Stat. 1363, enacted August 5, 2022
117-166	August 5, 2022	PPP and Bank Fraud Enforcement Harmonization Act of 2022	To amend the Small Business Act to extend the statute of limitation for fraud by borrowers under the Paycheck Protection Program, and for other purposes.	Pub. L. 117–166 (text) (PDF), H.R. 7352, 136 Stat. 1365, enacted August 5, 2022
117-167	August 9, 2022	CHIPS and Science Act or Creating Helpful Incentives to Produce Semiconductors for America Act	Making appropriations for Legislative Branch for the fiscal year ending September 30, 2022, and for other purposes.	Pub. L. 117–167 (text) (PDF), H.R. 4346, 136 Stat. 1366, enacted August 9, 2022
117-168	August 10, 2022	Honoring our PACT Act of 2022	To improve health care and benefits for veterans exposed to toxic substances, and for other purposes.	Pub. L. 117–168 (text) (PDF), S. 3373, 136 Stat. 1759, enacted August 10, 2022
117-169	August 16, 2022	Inflation Reduction Act of 2022	To provide for reconciliation pursuant to title II of S. Con. Res. 14.	Pub. L. 117–169 (text) (PDF), H.R. 5376, 136 Stat. 1818, enacted August 16, 2022
117-170	August 16, 2022	TBI and PTSD Law Enforcement Training Act	To direct the Attorney General to develop crisis intervention training tools for use by first responders related to interacting with persons who have a traumatic brain injury, another form of acquired brain injury, or post-traumatic stress disorder, and for other purposes.	Pub. L. 117–170 (text) (PDF), H.R. 2992, 136 Stat. 2091, enacted August 16, 2022
117-171	August 16, 2022	Reese's Law	To protect children and other consumers against hazards associated with the accidental ingestion of button cell or coin batteries by requiring the Consumer Product Safety Commission to promulgate a consumer product safety standard to require child-resistant closures on consumer products that use such batteries, and for other purposes.	Pub. L. 117–171 (text) (PDF), H.R. 5313, 136 Stat. 2094, enacted August 16, 2022
117-172	August 16, 2022	Public Safety Officer Support Act of 2022	To amend the Omnibus Crime Control and Safe Streets Act of 1968 to authorize public safety officer death benefits to officers suffering from post-traumatic stress disorder or acute stress disorder, and for other purposes.	Pub. L. 117–172 (text) (PDF), H.R. 6943, 136 Stat. 2098, enacted August 16, 2022
117-173	August 16, 2022	(No short title)	To include certain computer-related projects in the Federal permitting program under title XLI of the FAST Act, and for other purposes.	Pub. L. 117–173 (text) (PDF), S. 3451, 136 Stat. 2103, enacted August 16, 2022
117-174	August 26, 2022	Ensuring the Best Schools for Veterans Act of 2022	To amend title 38, United States Code, to improve the process by which the Secretary of Veterans Affairs determines whether an educational institution meets requirements relating to the percentage of students who receive educational assistance furnished by the Secretary, and for other purposes.	Pub. L. 117–174 (text) (PDF), S. 4458, 136 Stat. 2104, enacted August 26, 2022
117-175	September 16, 2022	Patient Advocate Tracker Act	To amend title 38, United States Code, to improve the ability of veterans to electronically submit complaints about the delivery of health care services by the Department of Veterans Affairs.	Pub. L. 117–175 (text) (PDF), H.R. 5754, 136 Stat. 2107, enacted September 16, 2022
117-176	September 16, 2022	Eliminating Limits to Justice for Child Sex Abuse Victims Act of 2022	To amend title 18, United States Code, to eliminate the statute of limitations for the filing of a civil claim for any person who, while a minor, was a victim of a violation of section 1589, 1590, 1591, 2241(c), 2242, 2243, 2251, 2251A, 2252, 2252A, 2260, 2421, 2422, or 2423 of such title.	Pub. L. 117–176 (text) (PDF), S. 3103, 136 Stat. 2108, enacted September 16, 2022
117-177	September 16, 2022	(No short title)	To extend by 19 days the authorization for the special assessment for the Domestic Trafficking Victims' Fund.	Pub. L. 117–177 (text) (PDF), S. 4785, 136 Stat. 2109, enacted September 16, 2022
117-178	September 29, 2022	Civilian Reservist Emergency Workforce (CREW) Act	To amend the Robert T. Stafford Disaster Relief and Emergency Assistance Act to provide certain employment rights to reservists of the Federal Emergency Management Agency, and for other purposes.	Pub. L. 117–178 (text) (PDF), S. 2293, 136 Stat. 2110, enacted September 29, 2022
117-179	September 30, 2022	(No short title)	To designate the clinic of the Department of Veterans Affairs in Mishawaka, Indiana, as the "Jackie Walorski VA Clinic".	Pub. L. 117–179 (text) (PDF), H.R. 8656, 136 Stat. 2112, enacted September 30, 2022
117-180	September 30, 2022	(No short title)	Making continuing appropriations for fiscal year 2023, and for other purposes.	Pub. L. 117–180 (text) (PDF), H.R. 6833, 136 Stat. 2114, enacted September 30, 2022
117-181	September 30, 2022	United States Commission on International Religious Freedom Reauthorization Act of 2022	To extend and authorize annual appropriations for the United States Commission on International Religious Freedom through fiscal year 2024.	Pub. L. 117–182 (text) (PDF), S. 3895, 136 Stat. 2177, enacted September 30, 2022
117-182	September 30, 2022	Protection and Advocacy for Voting Access Program Inclusion Act	To amend the Help America Vote Act of 2002 to explicitly authorize distribution of grant funds to the voting accessibility protection and advocacy system of the Commonwealth of the Northern Mariana Islands and the system serving the American Indian consortium, and for other purposes.	Pub. L. 117–182 (text) (PDF), S. 3969, 136 Stat. 2178, enacted September 30, 2022
117-183	September 30, 2022	SBIR and STTR Extension Act of 2022	To reauthorize the SBIR and STTR programs and pilot programs, and for other purposes.	Pub. L. 117–183 (text) (PDF), S. 4900, 136 Stat. 2180, enacted September 30, 2022
117-184	October 4, 2022	(No short title)	To designate the facility of the United States Postal Service located at 3900 Crown Road Southwest in Atlanta, Georgia, as the "John R. Lewis Post Office Building".	Pub. L. 117–184 (text) (PDF), H.R. 5577, 136 Stat. 2196, enacted October 4, 2022
117-185	October 4, 2022	Russia and Belarus SDR Exchange Prohibition Act of 2022	To prohibit the Secretary of the Treasury from engaging in transactions involving the exchange of Special Drawing Rights issued by the International Monetary Fund that are held by the Russian Federation or Belarus.	Pub. L. 117–186 (text) (PDF), H.R. 6899, 135 Stat. 2197, enacted October 4, 2022
117-186	October 10, 2022	Expedited Delivery of Airport Infrastructure Act of 2021	To amend title 49, United States Code, to permit the use of incentive payments to expedite certain federally financed airport development projects.	Pub. L. 117–186 (text) (PDF), H.R. 468, 136 Stat. 2199, enacted October 10, 2022
117-187	October 10, 2022	FTC Collaboration Act of 2021	To enhance cooperation between the Federal Trade Commission and State Attorneys General to combat unfair and deceptive practices, and for other purposes.	Pub. L. 117–187 (text) (PDF), H.R. 1766, 136 Stat. 2201, enacted October 10, 2022
117-188	October 10, 2022	One Stop Shop for Small Business Compliance Act of 2021	To amend the Small Business Act to require the Small Business and Agriculture Regulatory Enforcement Ombudsman to create a centralized website for compliance guides, and for other purposes.	Pub. L. 117–188 (text) (PDF), H.R. 4877, 136 Stat. 2203, enacted October 10, 2022
117-189	October 10, 2022	Small Project Efficient and Effective Disaster (SPEED) Recovery Act	To amend the Robert T. Stafford Disaster Relief and Emergency Assistance Act to increase the threshold for eligibility for assistance under sections 403, 406, 407, and 502 of such Act, and for other purposes.	Pub. L. 117–189 (text) (PDF), H.R. 5641, 136 Stat. 2204, enacted October 10, 2022
117-190	October 10, 2022	Fiscal Year 2022 Veterans Affairs Major Medical Facility Authorization Act	To authorize major medical facility projects for the Department of Veterans Affairs for fiscal year 2022, and for other purposes.	Pub. L. 117–190 (text) (PDF), H.R. 7500, 136 Stat. 2205, enacted October 10, 2022
117-191	October 10, 2022	Veterans' Compensation Cost-of-Living Adjustment Act of 2022	To increase, effective as of December 1, 2022, the rates of compensation for veterans with service-connected disabilities and the rates of dependency and indemnity compensation for the survivors of certain disabled veterans, and for other purposes.	Pub. L. 117–190 (text) (PDF), H.R. 7846, 136 Stat. 2207, enacted October 10, 2022
117-192	October 10, 2022	Bulk Infant Formula to Retail Shelves Act	To amend the Harmonized Tariff Schedule of the United States to suspend temporarily rates of duty on imports of certain infant formula base powder used in the manufacturing of infant formula in the United States, and for other purposes.	Pub. L. 117–192 (text) (PDF), H.R. 8982, 136 Stat. 2209, enacted October 10, 2022
117-193	October 11, 2022	(No short title)	To designate the facility of the United States Postal Service located at 810 South Pendleton Street in Easley, South Carolina, as the "Private First Class Barrett Lyle Austin Post Office Building".	Pub. L. 117–193 (text) (PDF), H.R. 91, 136 Stat. 2211, enacted October 11, 2022
117-194	October 11, 2022	(No short title)	To designate the facility of the United States Postal Service located at 110 Johnson Street in Pickens, South Carolina, as the "Specialist Four Charles Johnson Post Office".	Pub. L. 117–194 (text) (PDF), H.R. 92, 136 Stat. 2212, enacted October 11, 2022
117-195	October 11, 2022	(No short title)	To designate the facility of the United States Postal Service located at 170 Manhattan Avenue in Buffalo, New York, as the "Indiana Hunt-Martin Post Office Building".	Pub. L. 117–195 (text) (PDF), H.R. 2142, 136 Stat. 2213, enacted October 11, 2022
117-196	October 11, 2022	(No short title)	To designate the facility of the United States Postal Service located at 39 West Main Street, in Honeoye Falls, New York, as the "CW4 Christian J. Koch Memorial Post Office".	Pub. L. 117–196 (text) (PDF), H.R. 3508, 136 Stat. 2214, enacted October 11, 2022
117-197	October 11, 2022	(No short title)	To designate the facility of the United States Postal Service located at 223 West Chalan Santo Papa in Hagatna, Guam, as the "Atanasio Taitano Perez Post Office".	Pub. L. 117–197 (text) (PDF), H.R. 3539, 136 Stat. 2215, enacted October 11, 2022
117-198	October 11, 2022	(No short title)	To designate the facility of the United States Postal Service located at 1801 Town and Country Drive in Norco, California, as the "Lance Corporal Kareem Nikoui Memorial Post Office Building".	Pub. L. 117–198 (text) (PDF), H.R. 5809, 136 Stat. 2216, enacted October 11, 2022
117-199	October 11, 2022	(No short title)	To designate the outpatient clinic of the Department of Veterans Affairs in Ventura, California, as the "Captain Rosemary Bryant Mariner Outpatient Clinic".	Pub. L. 117–199 (text) (PDF), H.R. 7698, 136 Stat. 2217, enacted October 11, 2022
117-200	October 11, 2022	Joint Consolidation Loan Separation Act	To amend the Higher Education Act of 1965 to authorize borrowers to separate joint consolidation loans.	Pub. L. 117–200 (text) (PDF), S.1098 , 136 Stat. 2219, enacted October 11, 2022
117-201	October 17, 2022	Artistic Recognition for Talented Students (ARTS) Act	To amend title 17, United States Code, to require the Register of Copyrights to waive fees for filing an application for registration of a copyright claim in certain circumstances, and for other purposes.	Pub. L. 117–201 (text) (PDF), S.169 , 136 Stat. 2222, enacted October 17, 2022
117-202	October 17, 2022	Bulb Replacement Improving Government with High-efficiency Technology (BRIGHT) Act	To amend title 40, United States Code, to require the Administrator of General Services to procure the most life-cycle cost effective and energy efficient lighting products and to issue guidance on the efficiency, effectiveness, and economy of those products, and for other purposes.	Pub. L. 117–202 (text) (PDF), S.442 , 136 Stat. 2224, enacted October 17, 2022
117-203	October 17, 2022	Advanced Air Mobility Coordination and Leadership Act	To plan for and coordinate efforts to integrate advanced air mobility aircraft into the national airspace system, and for other purposes.	Pub. L. 117–203 (text) (PDF), S.516 , 136 Stat. 2227, enacted October 17, 2022
117-204	October 17, 2022	Maximizing Outcomes through Better Investments in Lifesaving Equipment for (MOBILE) Health Care Act	To amend the Public Health Service Act to expand the allowable use criteria for new access points grants for community health centers.	Pub. L. 117–204 (text) (PDF), S.958 , 136 Stat. 2231, enacted October 17, 2022
117-205	October 17, 2022	Solid Start Act of 2022	To amend title 38, United States Code, to improve and expand the Solid Start program of the Department of Veterans Affairs, and for other purposes.	Pub. L. 117–205 (text) (PDF), S.1198 , 136 Stat. 2232, enacted October 17, 2022
117-206	October 17, 2022	Blackwell School National Historic Site Act	To establish the Blackwell School National Historic Site in Marfa, Texas, and for other purposes.	Pub. L. 117–206 (text) (PDF), S.2490 , 136 Stat. 2235, enacted October 17, 2022
117-207	October 17, 2022	Artificial Intelligence Training for the Acquisition Workforce Act	To require the Director of the Office of Management and Budget to establish or otherwise provide an artificial intelligence training program for the acquisition workforce, and for other purposes.	Pub. L. 117–207 (text) (PDF), S.2551 , 136 Stat. 2238, enacted October 17, 2022
117-208	October 17, 2022	(No short title)	To designate the community-based outpatient clinic of the Department of Veterans Affairs in San Angelo, Texas, as the "Colonel Charles and JoAnne Powell Department of Veterans Affairs Clinic".	Pub. L. 117–208 (text) (PDF), S.2771 , 136 Stat. 2241, enacted October 17, 2022
117-209	October 17, 2022	Supporting Families of the Fallen Act	To amend title 38, United States Code, to increase automatic maximum coverage under the Servicemembers' Group Life Insurance program and the Veterans' Group Life Insurance program, and for other purposes.	Pub. L. 117–209 (text) (PDF), S.2794 , 136 Stat. 2243, enacted October 17, 2022
117-210	October 17, 2022	Bridging the Gap for New Americans Act	To require the Secretary of Labor to conduct a study of the factors affecting employment opportunities for immigrants and refugees with professional credentials obtained in foreign countries.	Pub. L. 117–210 (text) (PDF), S.3157 , 136 Stat. 2245, enacted October 17, 2022
117-211	October 17, 2022	End Human Trafficking in Government Contracts Act of 2022	To provide for the implementation of certain trafficking in contracting provisions, and for other purposes.	Pub. L. 117–211 (text) (PDF), S.3470 , 136 Stat. 2248, enacted October 17, 2022
117-212	October 17, 2022	Planning for Animal Wellness (PAW) Act	To require the Administrator of the Federal Emergency Management Agency to establish a working group relating to best practices and Federal guidance for animals in emergencies and disasters, and for other purposes.	Pub. L. 117–212 (text) (PDF), S.4205 , 136 Stat. 2249, enacted October 17, 2022
117-213	October 17, 2022	(No short title)	To amend section 301 of title 44, United States Code, to establish a term for the appointment of the Director of the Government Publishing Office.	Pub. L. 117–213 (text) (PDF), S.4791 , 136 Stat. 2251, enacted October 17, 2022
117-214	October 19, 2022	Global Malnutrition Prevention and Treatment Act of 2021	To advance targeted and evidence-based interventions for the prevention and treatment of global malnutrition and to improve the coordination of such programs, and for other purposes.	Pub. L. 117–214 (text) (PDF), H.R. 4693, 136 Stat. 2252, enacted October 19, 2022
117-215	December 2, 2022	Medical Marijuana and Cannabidiol Research Expansion Act	To expand research on cannabidiol and marijuana, and for other purposes.	Pub. L. 117–215 (text) (PDF), H.R. 8454, 136 Stat. 2257, enacted December 2, 2022
117-216	December 2, 2022	(No short title)	To provide for a resolution with respect to the unresolved disputes between certain railroads represented by the National Carriers' Conference Committee of the National Railway Labor Conference and certain of their employees.	Pub. L. 117–216 (text) (PDF), H.J.Res. 100, 136 Stat. 2267, enacted December 2, 2022
117-217	December 2, 2022	(No short title)	To designate the facility of the United States Postal Service located at 1304 4th Avenue in Canyon, Texas, as the "Gary James Fletcher Post Office Building".	Pub. L. 117–217 (text) (PDF), S. 3826, 136 Stat. 2269, enacted December 2, 2022
117-218	December 2, 2022	(No short title)	To designate the facility of the United States Postal Service located at 404 U.S. Highway 41 North in Baraga, Michigan, as the "Cora Reynolds Anderson Post Office".	Pub. L. 117–218 (text) (PDF), S. 3884, 136 Stat. 2270, enacted December 2, 2022
117-219	December 5, 2022	Metropolitan Areas Protection and Standardization Act of 2021	To direct the Director of the Office of Management and Budget to standardize the use of core-based statistical area designations across Federal programs, to allow between 120 and 180 days for public comment on any proposed change to such designations, and to report on the scientific basis and estimated impact to Federal programs for any proposed change to such designations, and for other purposes.	Pub. L. 117–219 (text) (PDF), S. 1941, 136 Stat. 2271, enacted December 5, 2022
117-220	December 5, 2022	(No short title)	To designate the community-based outpatient clinic of the Department of Veterans Affairs located at 400 College Drive, Middleburg, Florida, as the "Andrew K. Baker Department of Veterans Affairs Clinic", and for other purposes.	Pub. L. 117–220 (text) (PDF), S. 2159, 136 Stat. 2276, enacted December 5, 2022
117-221	December 5, 2022	Disaster Resiliency Planning Act	To require the Director of the Office of Management and Budget to issue guidance with respect to natural disaster resilience, and for other purposes.	Pub. L. 117–221 (text) (PDF), S. 3510, 136 Stat. 2277, enacted December 5, 2022
117-222	December 5, 2022	Civil Rights Cold Case Investigations Support Act of 2022	To amend the Civil Rights Cold Case Records Collection Act of 2018 to extend the termination date of the Civil Rights Cold Case Records Review Board.	Pub. L. 117–222 (text) (PDF), S. 3655, 136 Stat. 2279, enacted December 5, 2022
117-223	December 7, 2022	Safe Connections Act of 2022	To preserve safe access to communications services for survivors of domestic violence and other crimes, and for other purposes.	Pub. L. 117–223 (text) (PDF), H.R. 7132, 136 Stat. 2280, enacted December 7, 2022
117-224	December 7, 2022	Speak Out Act	To limit the judicial enforceability of predispute nondisclosure and nondisparagement contract clauses relating to disputes involving sexual assault and sexual harassment.	Pub. L. 117–224 (text) (PDF), S. 4524, 136 Stat. 2290, enacted December 7, 2022
117-225	December 9, 2022	First Responder Fair Return for Employees on Their Initial Retirement Earned Act	To permit disabled law enforcement officers, customs and border protection officers, firefighters, air traffic controllers, nuclear materials couriers, members of the Capitol Police, members of the Supreme Court Police, employees of the Central Intelligence Agency performing intelligence activities abroad or having specialized security requirements, and diplomatic security special agents of the Department of State to receive retirement benefits in the same manner as if they had not been disabled.	Pub. L. 117–225 (text) (PDF), H.R. 521, 136 Stat. 2293, enacted December 9, 2022
117-226	December 9, 2022	Max Cleland VA Medical Center Act	To designate the medical center of the Department of Veterans Affairs in metropolitan Atlanta, Georgia, as the "Joseph Maxwell Cleland Atlanta Department of Veterans Affairs Medical Center".	Pub. L. 117–226 (text) (PDF), S. 3369, 136 Stat. 2300, enacted December 9, 2022
117-227	December 9, 2022	Senator Johnny Isakson VA Regional Office Act of 2022	To designate the regional office of the Department of Veterans Affairs in metropolitan Atlanta as the "Senator Johnny Isakson Department of Veterans Affairs Atlanta Regional Office", and for other purposes.	Pub. L. 117–227 (text) (PDF), S. 4359, 136 Stat. 2303, enacted December 9, 2022
117-228	December 13, 2022	Respect for Marriage Act	To repeal the Defense of Marriage Act and ensure respect for State regulation of marriage, and for other purposes.	Pub. L. 117–228 (text) (PDF), H.R. 8404, 136 Stat. 2305, enacted December 13, 2022
117-229	December 16, 2022	Further Continuing Appropriations and Extensions Act, 2023	To amend the Weather Research and Forecasting Innovation Act of 2017 to direct the National Oceanic and Atmospheric Administration to provide comprehensive and regularly updated Federal precipitation information, and for other purposes.	Pub. L. 117–229 (text) (PDF), H.R. 1437, 136 Stat. 2308, enacted December 16, 2022
117-230	December 19, 2022	(No short title)	To designate the facility of the United States Postal Service located at 2141 Ferry Street in Anderson, California, as the "Norma Comnick Post Office Building".	Pub. L. 117–230 (text) (PDF), H.R. 228, 136 Stat. 2317, enacted December 19, 2022
117-231	December 19, 2022	(No short title)	To designate the facility of the United States Postal Service located at 303 East Mississippi Avenue in Elwood, Illinois, as the "Lawrence M. 'Larry' Walsh Sr. Post Office".	Pub. L. 117–231 (text) (PDF), H.R. 700, 136 Stat. 2318, enacted December 19, 2022
117-232	December 19, 2022	(No short title)	To designate the facility of the United States Postal Service located at 135 Main Street in Biloxi, Mississippi, as the "Robert S. McKeithen Post Office Building".	Pub. L. 117–232 (text) (PDF), H.R. 3175, 136 Stat. 2319, enacted December 19, 2022
117-233	December 19, 2022	(No short title)	To name the Department of Veterans Affairs community-based outpatient clinic in Forest City, North Carolina, as the "Master Sergeant Jerry K. Crump VA Clinic".	Pub. L. 117–233 (text) (PDF), H.R. 5481, 136 Stat. 2320, enacted December 19, 2022
117-234	December 19, 2022	(No short title)	To designate the facility of the United States Postal Service located at 4744 Grand River Avenue in Detroit, Michigan, as the "Rosa Louise McCauley Parks Post Office Building".	Pub. L. 117–234 (text) (PDF), H.R. 6614, 136 Stat. 2321, enacted December 19, 2022
117-235	December 20, 2022	(No short title)	To designate the Department of Veterans Affairs community-based outpatient clinic in French Camp, California, as the "Richard A. Pittman VA Clinic".	Pub. L. 117–235 (text) (PDF), H.R. 6722, 136 Stat. 2322, enacted December 20, 2022
117-236	December 20, 2022	(No short title)	To designate the medical center of the Department of Veterans Affairs in Memphis, Tennessee, as the "Lt. Col. Luke Weathers, Jr. VA Medical Center".	Pub. L. 117–236 (text) (PDF), H.R. 6863, 136 Stat. 2324, enacted December 20, 2022
117-237	December 20, 2022	(No short title)	To designate the Department of Veterans Affairs community-based outpatient clinic located in Canton, Michigan, as the "Major General Oliver W. Dillard VA Clinic".	Pub. L. 117–237 (text) (PDF), H.R. 7903, 136 Stat. 2326, enacted December 20, 2022
117-238	December 20, 2022	(No short title)	To designate the Department of Veterans Affairs community-based outpatient clinic located in Palm Desert, California, as the "Sy Kaplan VA Clinic".	Pub. L. 117–238 (text) (PDF), H.R. 7925, 136 Stat. 2328, enacted December 20, 2022
117-239	December 20, 2022	(No short title)	To designate the facility of the United States Postal Service located at 3903 Melear Drive in Arlington, Texas, as the "Ron Wright Post Office Building".	Pub. L. 117–239 (text) (PDF), S. 3825, 136 Stat. 2330, enacted December 20, 2022
117-240	December 20, 2022	(No short title)	To designate the United States courthouse located at 111 South Highland Avenue in Jackson, Tennessee, as the "James D. Todd United States Courthouse", and for other purposes.	Pub. L. 117–240 (text) (PDF), S. 4017, 136 Stat. 2331, enacted December 20, 2022
117-241	December 20, 2022	Early Hearing Detection and Intervention Act of 2022	To reauthorize a program for early detection, diagnosis, and treatment regarding deaf and hard-of-hearing newborns, infants, and young children, and for other purposes.	Pub. L. 117–241 (text) (PDF), S. 4052, 136 Stat. 2332, enacted December 20, 2022
117-242	December 20, 2022	Paul D. Wellstone Building Act of 2022	To redesignate the Federal building located at 212 Third Avenue South in Minneapolis, Minnesota, as the "Paul D. Wellstone Federal Building", and for other purposes.	Pub. L. 117–242 (text) (PDF), S. 5060, 136 Stat. 2334, enacted December 20, 2022
117-243	December 20, 2022	Big Cat Public Safety Act	To amend the Lacey Act Amendments of 1981 to clarify provisions enacted by the Captive Wildlife Safety Act, to further the conservation of certain wildlife species, and for other purposes.	Pub. L. 117–243 (text) (PDF), H.R. 263, 136 Stat. 2336, enacted December 20, 2022
117-244	December 20, 2022	Cardiovascular Advances in Research and Opportunities Legacy Act	To amend title IV of the Public Health Service Act to direct the Director of the National Institutes of Health, in consultation with the Director of the National Heart, Lung, and Blood Institute, to establish a program under which the Director of the National Institutes of Health shall support or conduct research on valvular heart disease, and for other purposes.	Pub. L. 117–244 (text) (PDF), H.R. 1193, 136 Stat. 2340, enacted December 20, 2022
117-245	December 20, 2022	Patents for Humanity Act of 2022	To amend title 35, United States Code, to establish a competition to award certificates that can be redeemed to accelerate certain matters at the Patent and Trademark Office, and for other purposes.	Pub. L. 117–245 (text) (PDF), H.R. 5796, 136 Stat. 2343, enacted December 20, 2022
117-246	December 20, 2022	Empowering the U.S. Fire Administration Act	To require the United States Fire Administration to conduct on-site investigations of major fires, and for other purposes.	Pub. L. 117–246 (text) (PDF), H.R. 7077, 136 Stat. 2345, enacted December 20, 2022
117-247	December 20, 2022	Data Mapping to Save Moms' Lives Act	To require the Federal Communications Commission to incorporate data on maternal health outcomes into its broadband health maps.	Pub. L. 117–247 (text) (PDF), S. 198, 136 Stat. 2347, enacted December 20, 2022
117-248	December 20, 2022	Protecting Firefighters from Adverse Substances Act	To direct the Administrator of the Federal Emergency Management Agency to develop guidance for firefighters and other emergency response personnel on best practices to protect them from exposure to PFAS and to limit and prevent the release of PFAS into the environment, and for other purposes.	Pub. L. 117–248 (text) (PDF), S. 231, 136 Stat. 2348, enacted December 20, 2022
117-249	December 20, 2022	Disaster Assistance for Rural Communities Act	To modify the requirements for the Administrator of the Small Business Administration relating to declaring a disaster in a rural area, and for other purposes.	Pub. L. 117–249 (text) (PDF), S. 1617, 136 Stat. 2350, enacted December 20, 2022
117-250	December 20, 2022	Rural Opioid Abuse Prevention Act	To amend the Omnibus Crime Control and Safe Streets Act of 1968 to provide for the eligibility of rural community response pilot programs for funding under the Comprehensive Opioid Abuse Grant Program, and for other purposes.	Pub. L. 117–250 (text) (PDF), S. 2796, 136 Stat. 2352, enacted December 20, 2022
117-251	December 20, 2022	FEMA Improvement, Reform, and Efficiency Act of 2022	To amend the Robert T. Stafford Disaster Relief and Emergency Assistance Act to improve the provision of certain disaster assistance, and for other purposes.	Pub. L. 117–251 (text) (PDF), S. 3092, 136 Stat. 2354, enacted December 20, 2022
117-252	December 20, 2022	Pro bono Work to Empower and Represent Act of 2021	To remove the four-year sunset from the Pro bono Work to Empower and Represent Act of 2018.	Pub. L. 117–252 (text) (PDF), S. 3115, 136 Stat. 2359, enacted December 20, 2022
117-253	December 20, 2022	(No short title)	To amend the Post-Katrina Emergency Management Reform Act of 2006 to repeal certain obsolete requirements, and for other purposes.	Pub. L. 117–253 (text) (PDF), S. 3499, 136 Stat. 2360, enacted December 20, 2022
117-254	December 20, 2022	Preventing PFAS Runoff at Airports Act	To temporarily increase the cost share authority for aqueous film forming foam input-based testing equipment, and for other purposes.	Pub. L. 117–254 (text) (PDF), S. 3662, 136 Stat. 2361, enacted December 20, 2022
117-255	December 20, 2022	Community Disaster Resilience Zones Act of 2022	To require the President to develop and maintain products that show the risk of natural hazards across the United States, and for other purposes.	Pub. L. 117–255 (text) (PDF), S. 3875, 136 Stat. 2363, enacted December 20, 2022
117-256	December 21, 2022	(No short title)	To posthumously award the Congressional Gold Medal, collectively, to Glen Doherty, Tyrone Woods, J. Christopher Stevens, and Sean Smith, in recognition of their contributions to the Nation.	Pub. L. 117–256 (text) (PDF), H.R. 310, 136 Stat. 2368, enacted December 21, 2022
117-257	December 21, 2022	(No short title)	To amend title 40, United States Code, to modify the treatment of certain bargain-price options to purchase at less than fair market value, and for other purposes.	Pub. L. 117–257 (text) (PDF), H.R. 2220, 136 Stat. 2371, enacted December 21, 2022
117-258	December 21, 2022	Safeguard Tribal Objects of Patrimony Act of 2021	To enhance protections of Native American tangible cultural heritage, and for other purposes.	Pub. L. 117–258 (text) (PDF), H.R. 2930, 136 Stat. 2372, enacted December 21, 2022
117-259	December 21, 2022	SBA Cyber Awareness Act	To require an annual report on the cybersecurity of the Small Business Administration, and for other purposes.	Pub. L. 117–259 (text) (PDF), H.R. 3462, 136 Stat. 2387, enacted December 21, 2022
117-260	December 21, 2022	Quantum Computing Cybersecurity Preparedness Act	To encourage the migration of Federal Government information technology systems to quantum-resistant cryptography, and for other purposes.	Pub. L. 117–260 (text) (PDF), H.R. 7535, 136 Stat. 2389, enacted December 21, 2022
117-261	December 21, 2022	Klamath Tribe Judgment Fund Repeal Act	To repeal the Klamath Tribe Judgment Fund Act.	Pub. L. 117–261 (text) (PDF), S. 314, 136 Stat. 2393, enacted December 21, 2022
117-262	December 21, 2022	Providing Resources, Officers, and Technology to Eradicate Cyber Threats to Our Children Act of 2022	To reauthorize the National Internet Crimes Against Children Task Force Program.	Pub. L. 117–262 (text) (PDF), S. 4834, 136 Stat. 2394, enacted December 21, 2022
117-263	December 23, 2022	James M. Inhofe National Defense Authorization Act for Fiscal Year 2023	To authorize appropriations for fiscal year 2023 for military activities of the Department of Defense, for military construction, and for defense activities of the Department of Energy, to prescribe military personnel strengths for such fiscal year, and for other purposes.	Pub. L. 117–263 (text) (PDF), H.R. 7776, 136 Stat. 2395, enacted December 23, 2022
117-264	December 23, 2022	Further Additional Continuing Appropriations and Extensions Act, 2023	Making further continuing appropriations for the fiscal year ending September 30, 2023, and for other purposes.	Pub. L. 117–264 (text) (PDF), H.R. 4373, 136 Stat. 4167, enacted December 23, 2022
117-265	December 27, 2022	(No short title)	To designate the facility of the United States Postal Service located at 4020 Broadway Street in Houston, Texas, as the "Benny C. Martinez Post Office Building".	Pub. L. 117–265 (text) (PDF), H.R. 203, 136 Stat. 4170, enacted December 27, 2022
117-266	December 27, 2022	Don Young Alaska Native Health Care Land Transfers Act of 2022	To provide for the conveyance of certain property to the Tanana Tribal Council located in Tanana, Alaska, the conveyance of certain property to the Southeast Alaska Regional Health Consortium located in Sitka, Alaska, and the conveyance of certain property to the Alaska Native Tribal Health Consortium located in Anchorage, Alaska, and for other purposes.	Pub. L. 117–266 (text) (PDF), H.R. 441, 136 Stat. 4171, enacted December 27, 2022
117-267	December 27, 2022	Blackwater Trading Post Land Transfer Act	To direct the Secretary of the Interior to take certain land located in Pinal County, Arizona, into trust for the benefit of the Gila River Indian Community, and for other purposes.	Pub. L. 117–267 (text) (PDF), H.R. 478, 136 Stat. 4174, enacted December 27, 2022
117-268	December 27, 2022	(No short title)	To designate the facility of the United States Postal Service located at 101 South Willowbrook Avenue in Compton, California, as the "PFC James Anderson, Jr., Post Office Building".	Pub. L. 117–268 (text) (PDF), H.R. 1095, 136 Stat. 4176, enacted December 27, 2022
117-269	December 27, 2022	(No short title)	To designate the facility of the United States Postal Service located at 82422 Cadiz Jewett Road in Cadiz, Ohio, as the "John Armor Bingham Post Office".	Pub. L. 117–269 (text) (PDF), H.R. 2472, 136 Stat. 4177, enacted December 27, 2022
117-270	December 27, 2022	(No short title)	To designate the facility of the United States Postal Service located at 275 Penn Avenue in Salem, Ohio as the "Howard Arthur Tibbs Post Office".	Pub. L. 117–270 (text) (PDF), H.R. 2473, 136 Stat. 4178, enacted December 27, 2022
117-271	December 27, 2022	(No short title)	To amend title 38, United States Code, to direct the Secretary of Veterans Affairs to provide for peer support specialists for claimants who are survivors of military sexual trauma, and for other purposes.	Pub. L. 117–271 (text) (PDF), H.R. 2724, 136 Stat. 4179, enacted December 27, 2022
117-272	December 27, 2022	21st Century President Act	To amend gendered terms in Federal law relating to the President and the President's spouse.	Pub. L. 117–272 (text) (PDF), H.R. 3285, 136 Stat. 4181, enacted December 27, 2022
117-273	December 27, 2022	War Crimes Rewards Expansion Act	To amend the State Department Basic Authorities Act of 1956 to provide for rewards for the arrest or conviction of certain foreign nationals who have committed genocide or war crimes, and for other purposes.	Pub. L. 117–273 (text) (PDF), H.R. 4250, 136 Stat. 4182, enacted December 27, 2022
117-274	December 27, 2022	(No short title)	To designate the facility of the United States Postal Service located at 226 North Main Street in Roseville, Ohio, as the "Ronald E. Rosser Post Office".	Pub. L. 117–274 (text) (PDF), H.R. 4622, 136 Stat. 4183, enacted December 27, 2022
117-275	December 27, 2022	Old Pascua Community Land Acquisition Act	To direct the Secretary of the Interior to take into trust for the Pascua Yaqui Tribe of Arizona certain land in Pima County, Arizona, and for other purposes.	Pub. L. 117–275 (text) (PDF), H.R. 4881, 136 Stat. 4184, enacted December 27, 2022
117-276	December 27, 2022	(No short title)	To designate the facility of the United States Postal Service located at 10 Broadway Street West, in Akeley, Minnesota, as the "Neal Kenneth Todd Post Office".	Pub. L. 117–276 (text) (PDF), H.R. 4899, 136 Stat. 4186, enacted December 27, 2022
117-277	December 27, 2022	(No short title)	To designate the facility of the United States Postal Service located at 2245 Rosa L Parks Boulevard in Nashville, Tennessee, as the "Thelma Harper Post Office Building".	Pub. L. 117–277 (text) (PDF), H.R. 5271, 136 Stat. 4187, enacted December 27, 2022
117-278	December 27, 2022	(No short title)	To designate the facility of the United States Postal Service located at 1550 State Road S-38-211 in Orangeburg, South Carolina, as the "J.I. Washington Post Office Building".	Pub. L. 117–278 (text) (PDF), H.R. 5349, 136 Stat. 4188, enacted December 27, 2022
117-279	December 27, 2022	(No short title)	To designate the facility of the United States Postal Service located at 16605 East Avenue of the Fountains in Fountain Hills, Arizona, as the "Dr. C.T. Wright Post Office Building".	Pub. L. 117–279 (text) (PDF), H.R. 5650, 136 Stat. 4189, enacted December 27, 2022
117-280	December 27, 2022	(No short title)	To designate the facility of the United States Postal Service located at 1961 North C Street in Oxnard, California, as the "John R. Hatcher III Post Office Building".	Pub. L. 117–280 (text) (PDF), H.R. 5659, 136 Stat. 4190, enacted December 27, 2022
117-281	December 27, 2022	(No short title)	To designate the facility of the United States Postal Service located at 850 Walnut Street in McKeesport, Pennsylvania, as the "First Sergeant Leonard A. Funk, Jr. Post Office Building".	Pub. L. 117–281 (text) (PDF), H.R. 5794, 136 Stat. 4191, enacted December 27, 2022
117-282	December 27, 2022	(No short title)	To designate the facility of the United States Postal Service located at 4110 Bluebonnet Drive in Stafford, Texas, as the "Leonard Scarcella Post Office Building".	Pub. L. 117–282 (text) (PDF), H.R. 5865, 136 Stat. 4192, enacted December 27, 2022
117-283	December 27, 2022	(No short title)	To designate the facility of the United States Postal Service located at 2016 East 1st Street in Los Angeles, California, as the "Marine Corps Reserve PVT Jacob Cruz Post Office".	Pub. L. 117–283 (text) (PDF), H.R. 5900, 136 Stat. 4193, enacted December 27, 2022
117-284	December 27, 2022	(No short title)	To designate the outpatient clinic of the Department of Veterans Affairs in Greenville, South Carolina, as the "Lance Corporal Dana Cornell Darnell VA Clinic".	Pub. L. 117–284 (text) (PDF), H.R. 5943, 136 Stat. 4194, enacted December 27, 2022
117-285	December 27, 2022	(No short title)	To designate the facility of the United States Postal Service located at 123 East Main Street, in Vergas, Minnesota, as the "Jon Glawe Post Office".	Pub. L. 117–285 (text) (PDF), H.R. 5952, 136 Stat. 4195, enacted December 27, 2022
117-286	December 27, 2022	(No short title)	To make revisions in title 5, United States Code, as necessary to keep the title current, and to make technical amendments to improve the United States Code.	Pub. L. 117–286 (text) (PDF), H.R. 5961, 136 Stat. 4196, enacted December 27, 2022
117-287	December 27, 2022	Great Lakes Fish and Wildlife Restoration Reauthorization Act of 2022	To reauthorize the Great Lakes Fish and Wildlife Restoration Act of 1990, and for other purposes.	Pub. L. 117–287 (text) (PDF), H.R. 5973, 136 Stat. 4363, enacted December 27, 2022
117-288	December 27, 2022	(No short title)	To designate the facility of the United States Postal Service located at 213 William Hilton Parkway in Hilton Head Island, South Carolina, as the "Caesar H. Wright Jr. Post Office Building".	Pub. L. 117–288 (text) (PDF), H.R. 6042, 136 Stat. 4365, enacted December 27, 2022
117-289	December 27, 2022	(No short title)	To direct the Secretary of Veterans Affairs to seek to enter into an agreement with the National Academies of Sciences, Engineering, and Medicine for a review of examinations, furnished by the Secretary, to individuals who submit claims to the Secretary for compensation under chapter 11 of title 38, United States Code, for mental and physical conditions linked to military sexual trauma.	Pub. L. 117–289 (text) (PDF), H.R. 6064, 136 Stat. 4366, enacted December 27, 2022
117-290	December 27, 2022	(No short title)	To designate the facility of the United States Postal Service located at 5420 Kavanaugh Boulevard in Little Rock, Arkansas, as the "Ronald A. Robinson Post Office".	Pub. L. 117–290 (text) (PDF), H.R. 6080, 136 Stat. 4368, enacted December 27, 2022
117-291	December 27, 2022	(No short title)	To designate the facility of the United States Postal Service located at 317 Blattner Drive in Avon, Minnesota, as the "W.O.C. Kort Miller Plantenberg Post Office".	Pub. L. 117–291 (text) (PDF), H.R. 6218, 136 Stat. 4369, enacted December 27, 2022
117-292	December 27, 2022	(No short title)	To designate the facility of the United States Postal Service located at 100 3rd Avenue Northwest in Perham, Minnesota, as the "Charles P. Nord Post Office".	Pub. L. 117–292 (text) (PDF), H.R. 6220, 136 Stat. 4370, enacted December 27, 2022
117-293	December 27, 2022	(No short title)	To designate the facility of the United States Postal Service located at 155 Main Avenue West in Winsted, Minnesota, as the "James A. Rogers Jr. Post Office".	Pub. L. 117–293 (text) (PDF), H.R. 6221, 136 Stat. 4371, enacted December 27, 2022
117-294	December 27, 2022	(No short title)	To designate the facility of the United States Postal Service located at 15 Chestnut Street in Suffern, New York, as the "Sergeant Gerald T. 'Jerry' Donnellan Post Office".	Pub. L. 117–294 (text) (PDF), H.R. 6267, 136 Stat. 4372, enacted December 27, 2022
117-295	December 27, 2022	(No short title)	To designate the facility of the United States Postal Service located at 450 West Schaumburg Road in Schaumburg, Illinois, as the "Veterans of Iraq and Afghanistan Memorial Post Office Building".	Pub. L. 117–295 (text) (PDF), H.R. 6386, 136 Stat. 4373, enacted December 27, 2022
117-296	December 27, 2022	Red River National Wildlife Refuge Boundary Modification Act	To amend the Red River National Wildlife Refuge Act to modify the boundary of the Red River National Wildlife Refuge, and for other purposes.	Pub. L. 117–296 (text) (PDF), H.R. 6427, 136 Stat. 4374, enacted December 27, 2022
117-297	December 27, 2022	Veterans Eligible to Transfer School (VETS) Credit Act	To amend title 38, United States Code, to improve the method by which the Secretary of Veterans Affairs determines the effects of a closure or disapproval of an educational institution on individuals who do not transfer credits from such institution.	Pub. L. 117–297 (text) (PDF), H.R. 6604, 136 Stat. 4375, enacted December 27, 2022
117-298	December 27, 2022	(No short title)	To designate the facility of the United States Postal Service located at 1400 N Kraemer Blvd. in Placentia, California, as the "PFC Jang Ho Kim Post Office Building".	Pub. L. 117–298 (text) (PDF), H.R. 6630, 136 Stat. 4377, enacted December 27, 2022
117-299	December 27, 2022	(No short title)	To designate the facility of the United States Postal Service located at 301 East Congress Parkway in Crystal Lake, Illinois, as the "Ryan J. Cummings Post Office Building".	Pub. L. 117–299 (text) (PDF), H.R. 6917, 136 Stat. 4378, enacted December 27, 2022
117-300	December 27, 2022	(No short title)	To amend title 38, United States Code, to improve hearings before the Board of Veterans' Appeals regarding claims involving military sexual trauma.	Pub. L. 117–300 (text) (PDF), H.R. 6961, 136 Stat. 4379, enacted December 27, 2022
117-301	December 27, 2022	Human Trafficking Prevention Act of 2022	To amend the Trafficking Victims Protection Act of 2000 to direct the Secretary of Transportation to seek to provide for the posting of contact information of the national human trafficking hotline in the restrooms of each aircraft, airport, over-the-road bus, bus station, passenger train, and passenger railroad station operating within the United States, and for other purposes.	Pub. L. 117–301 (text) (PDF), H.R. 7181, 136 Stat. 4382, enacted December 27, 2022
117-302	December 27, 2022	Strengthening VA Cybersecurity Act of 2022	To require the Secretary of Veterans Affairs to obtain an independent cybersecurity assessment of information systems of the Department of Veterans Affairs, and for other purposes.	Pub. L. 117–302 (text) (PDF), H.R. 7299, 136 Stat. 4384, enacted December 27, 2022
117-303	December 27, 2022	MST Claims Coordination Act	To improve coordination between the Veterans Health Administration and the Veterans Benefits Administration with respect to claims for compensation arising from military sexual trauma, and for other purposes.	Pub. L. 117–303 (text) (PDF), H.R. 7335, 136 Stat. 4387, enacted December 27, 2022
117-304	December 27, 2022	(No short title)	To designate the facility of the United States Postal Service located at 345 South Main Street in Butler, Pennsylvania, as the "Andrew Gomer Williams Post Office Building".	Pub. L. 117–304 (text) (PDF), H.R. 7514, 136 Stat. 4389, enacted December 27, 2022
117-305	December 27, 2022	(No short title)	To designate the facility of the United States Postal Service located at 23200 John R Road in Hazel Park, Michigan, as the "Roy E. Dickens Post Office".	Pub. L. 117–305 (text) (PDF), H.R. 7518, 136 Stat. 4390, enacted December 27, 2022
117-306	December 27, 2022	(No short title)	To designate the facility of the United States Postal Service located at 2050 South Boulevard in Bloomfield Township, Michigan, as the "Dr. Ezra S. Parke Post Office Building".	Pub. L. 117–306 (text) (PDF), H.R. 7519, 136 Stat. 4391, enacted December 27, 2022
117-307	December 27, 2022	(No short title)	To designate the facility of the United States Postal Service located at 6000 South Florida Avenue in Lakeland, Florida, as the "U.S. Marine Corporal Ronald R. Payne Jr. Post Office".	Pub. L. 117–307 (text) (PDF), H.R. 7638, 136 Stat. 4392, enacted December 27, 2022
117-308	December 27, 2022	Improving Access to the VA Home Loan Benefit Act of 2022	To direct the Secretary of Veterans Affairs to update the appraisal requirements for certain loans guaranteed by the Department of Veterans Affairs, and for other purposes.	Pub. L. 117–308 (text) (PDF), H.R. 7735, 136 Stat. 4393, enacted December 27, 2022
117-309	December 27, 2022	(No short title)	To designate the facility of the United States Postal Service located at 100 South 1st Street in Minneapolis, Minnesota, as the "Martin Olav Sabo Post Office".	Pub. L. 117–309 (text) (PDF), H.R. 8025, 136 Stat. 4395, enacted December 27, 2022
117-310	December 27, 2022	(No short title)	To designate the facility of the United States Postal Service located at 825 West 65th Street in Minneapolis, Minnesota, as the "Charles W. Lindberg Post Office".	Pub. L. 117–310 (text) (PDF), H.R. 8026, 136 Stat. 4396, enacted December 27, 2022
117-311	December 27, 2022	(No short title)	To designate the facility of the United States Postal Service located at 651 Business Interstate Highway 35 North Suite 420 in New Braunfels, Texas, as the "Bob Krueger Post Office".	Pub. L. 117–311 (text) (PDF), H.R. 8203, 136 Stat. 4397, enacted December 27, 2022
117-312	December 27, 2022	(No short title)	To designate the facility of the United States Postal Service located at 236 Concord Exchange North in South Saint Paul, Minnesota, as the "Officer Leo Pavlak Post Office Building".	Pub. L. 117–312 (text) (PDF), H.R. 8226, 136 Stat. 4398, enacted December 27, 2022
117-313	December 27, 2022	Faster Payments to Veterans' Survivors Act of 2022	To amend title 38, United States Code, to shorten the timeframe for designation of benefits under Department of Veterans Affairs life insurance programs, to improve the treatment of undisbursed life insurance benefits by the Department of Veterans Affairs, and for other purposes.	Pub. L. 117–313 (text) (PDF), H.R. 8260, 136 Stat. 4399, enacted December 27, 2022
117-314	December 27, 2022	(No short title)	To designate the facility of the United States Postal Service located at 6401 El Cajon Boulevard in San Diego, California, as the "Susan A. Davis Post Office".	Pub. L. 117–314 (text) (PDF), H.R. 9308, 136 Stat. 4403, enacted December 27, 2022
117-315	December 27, 2022	VAWA Technical Amendment Act of 2022	To make a technical amendment to the Violence Against Women Act of 1994, and for other purposes.	Pub. L. 117–315 (text) (PDF), S. 7, 136 Stat. 4404, enacted December 27, 2022
117-316	December 27, 2022	Flood Level Observation, Operations, and Decision Support Act	To establish a national integrated flood information system within the National Oceanic and Atmospheric Administration, and for other purposes.	Pub. L. 117–316 (text) (PDF), S. 558, 136 Stat. 4406, enacted December 27, 2022
117-317	December 27, 2022	Repealing Existing Substandard Provisions Encouraging Conciliation with Tribes Act	To repeal certain obsolete laws relating to Indians.	Pub. L. 117–317 (text) (PDF), S. 789, 136 Stat. 4419, enacted December 27, 2022
117-318	December 27, 2022	Saline Lake Ecosystems in the Great Basin States Program Act of 2022	To authorize the Director of the United States Geological Survey to establish a regional program to assess, monitor, and benefit the hydrology of saline lakes in the Great Basin and the migratory birds and other wildlife dependent on those habitats, and for other purposes.	Pub. L. 117–318 (text) (PDF), S. 1466, 136 Stat. 4421, enacted December 27, 2022
117-319	December 27, 2022	Small Business Cyber Training Act of 2022	To amend section 21 of the Small Business Act to require cyber certification for small business development center counselors, and for other purposes.	Pub. L. 117–319 (text) (PDF), S. 1687, 136 Stat. 4424, enacted December 27, 2022
117-320	December 27, 2022	Iran Hostages Congressional Gold Medal Act	To award a Congressional Gold Medal to the former hostages of the Iran Hostage Crisis of 1979-1981, highlighting their resilience throughout the unprecedented ordeal that they lived through and the national unity it produced, marking 4 decades since their 444 days in captivity, and recognizing their sacrifice to the United States.	Pub. L. 117–320 (text) (PDF), S. 2607, 136 Stat. 4426, enacted December 27, 2022
117-321	December 27, 2022	Prison Camera Reform Act of 2021	To require the Director of the Bureau of Prisons to address deficiencies and make necessary upgrades to the security camera and radio systems of the Bureau of Prisons to ensure the health and safety of employees and inmates.	Pub. L. 117–321 (text) (PDF), S. 2899, 136 Stat. 4430, enacted December 27, 2022
117-322	December 27, 2022	Countering Human Trafficking Act of 2021	To establish a Department of Homeland Security Center for Countering Human Trafficking, and for other purposes.	Pub. L. 117–322 (text) (PDF), S. 2991, 136 Stat. 4433, enacted December 27, 2022
117-323	December 27, 2022	Justice and Mental Health Collaboration Reauthorization Act of 2022	To reauthorize the Justice and Mental Health Collaboration Program, and for other purposes.	Pub. L. 117–323 (text) (PDF), S. 3846, 136 Stat. 4437, enacted December 27, 2022
117-324	December 27, 2022	Preventing Organizational Conflicts of Interest in Federal Acquisition Act	To prevent organizational conflicts of interest in Federal acquisition, and for other purposes.	Pub. L. 117–324 (text) (PDF), S. 3905, 136 Stat. 4439, enacted December 27, 2022
117-325	December 27, 2022	Law Enforcement De-Escalation Training Act of 2022	To amend the Omnibus Crime Control and Safe Streets Act of 1968 to provide for training on alternatives to use of force, de-escalation, and mental and behavioral health and suicidal crises.	Pub. L. 117–325 (text) (PDF), S. 4003, 136 Stat. 4441, enacted December 27, 2022
117-326	December 27, 2022	(No short title)	To direct the Joint Committee of Congress on the Library to remove the bust of Roger Brooke Taney in the Old Supreme Court Chamber of the Capitol and to obtain a bust of Thurgood Marshall for installation in the Capitol or on the Capitol Grounds, and for other purposes.	Pub. L. 117–326 (text) (PDF), S. 5229, 136 Stat. 4452, enacted December 27, 2022
117-327	December 27, 2022	Billy's Law	To increase accessibility to the National Missing and Unidentified Persons System, to facilitate data sharing between such system and the National Crime Information Center database of the Federal Bureau of Investigation, and for other purposes.	Pub. L. 117–327 (text) (PDF), S. 5230, 136 Stat. 4454, enacted December 27, 2022
117-328	December 29, 2022	Consolidated Appropriations Act, 2023	Making consolidated appropriations for the fiscal year ending September 30, 2023, and for providing emergency assistance for the situation in Ukraine, and for other purposes.	Pub. L. 117–328 (text) (PDF), H.R. 2617, 136 Stat. 4459, enacted December 29, 2022
117-329	January 5, 2023	Agua Caliente Land Exchange Fee to Trust Confirmation Act	To take certain lands in California into trust for the benefit of the Agua Caliente Band of Cahuilla Indians, and for other purposes.	Pub. L. 117–329 (text) (PDF), H.R. 897, 136 Stat. 6112, enacted January 5, 2023
117-330	January 5, 2023	Sami's Law	To study the incidence of fatal and non-fatal assaults in TNC and for-hire vehicles in order to enhance safety and save lives.	Pub. L. 117–330 (text) (PDF), H.R. 1082, 136 Stat. 6114, enacted January 5, 2023
117-331	January 5, 2023	Great Dismal Swamp National Heritage Area Act	To authorize the Secretary of the Interior to conduct a study to assess the suitability and feasibility of designating certain land as the Great Dismal Swamp National Heritage Area, and for other purposes.	Pub. L. 117–331 (text) (PDF), H.R. 1154, 136 Stat. 6116, enacted January 5, 2023
117-332	January 5, 2023	Hazard Eligibility and Local Projects Act	To modify eligibility requirements for certain hazard mitigation assistance programs, and for other purposes.	Pub. L. 117–332 (text) (PDF), H.R. 1917, 136 Stat. 6119, enacted January 5, 2023
117-333	January 5, 2023	Veterans Auto and Education Improvement Act of 2022	To make permanent certain educational assistance benefits under the laws administered by the Secretary of Veterans Affairs in the case of changes to courses of education by reason of emergency situations, and for other purposes.	Pub. L. 117–333 (text) (PDF), H.R. 7939, 136 Stat. 6121, enacted January 5, 2023
117-334	January 5, 2023	Emmett Till and Mamie Till-Mobley Congressional Gold Medal Act of 2021	To award posthumously the Congressional Gold Medal to Emmett Till and Mamie Till-Mobley.	Pub. L. 117–334 (text) (PDF), S. 450, 136 Stat. 6140, enacted January 5, 2023
117-335	January 5, 2023	Native American Language Resource Center Act of 2022	To establish a Native American language resource center in furtherance of the policy set forth in the Native American Languages Act.	Pub. L. 117–335 (text) (PDF), S. 989, 136 Stat. 6143, enacted January 5, 2023
117-336	January 5, 2023	Protecting American Intellectual Property Act of 2022	To authorize the imposition of sanctions with respect to foreign persons that have engaged in significant theft of trade secrets of United States persons, and for other purposes.	Pub. L. 117–336 (text) (PDF), S. 1294, 136 Stat. 6147, enacted January 5, 2023
117-337	January 5, 2023	Durbin Feeling Native American Languages Act of 2022	To amend the Native American Languages Act to ensure the survival and continuing vitality of Native American languages, and for other purposes.	Pub. L. 117–337 (text) (PDF), S. 1402, 136 Stat. 6153, enacted January 5, 2023
117-338	January 5, 2023	Martha Wright-Reed Just and Reasonable Communications Act of 2022	To amend the Communications Act of 1934 to require the Federal Communications Commission to ensure just and reasonable charges for telephone and advanced communications services in correctional and detention facilities.	Pub. L. 117–338 (text) (PDF), S. 1541, 136 Stat. 6156, enacted January 5, 2023
117-339	January 5, 2023	National Heritage Area Act	To standardize the designation of National Heritage Areas, and for other purposes.	Pub. L. 117–339 (text) (PDF), S. 1942, 136 Stat. 6158, enacted January 5, 2023
117-340	January 5, 2023	Equal Pay for Team USA Act of 2022	To amend chapter 2205 of title 36, United States Code, to ensure equal treatment of athletes, and for other purposes.	Pub. L. 117–340 (text) (PDF), S. 2333, 136 Stat. 6175, enacted January 5, 2023
117-341	January 5, 2023	Dr. Joanne Smith Memorial Rehabilitation Innovation Centers Act of 2022	To amend title XVIII of the Social Security Act to preserve access to rehabilitation innovation centers under the Medicare program.	Pub. L. 117–341 (text) (PDF), S. 2834, 136 Stat. 6179, enacted January 5, 2023
117-342	January 5, 2023	(No short title)	To amend the White Mountain Apache Tribe Water Rights Quantification Act of 2010 to modify the enforceability date for certain provisions, and for other purposes.	Pub. L. 117–342 (text) (PDF), S. 3168, 136 Stat. 6182, enacted January 5, 2023
117-343	January 5, 2023	Colorado River Indian Tribes Water Resiliency Act of 2022	To authorize the Colorado River Indian Tribes to enter into lease or exchange agreements and storage agreements relating to water of the Colorado River allocated to the Colorado River Indian Tribes, and for other purposes.	Pub. L. 117–343 (text) (PDF), S. 3308, 136 Stat. 6186, enacted January 5, 2023
117-344	January 5, 2023	Low Power Protection Act	To require the Federal Communications Commission to issue a rule providing that certain low power television stations may be accorded primary status as Class A television licensees, and for other purposes.	Pub. L. 117–344 (text) (PDF), S. 3405, 136 Stat. 6193, enacted January 5, 2023
117-345	January 5, 2023	Butterfield Overland National Historic Trail Designation Act	To amend the National Trails System Act to designate the Butterfield Overland National Historic Trail, and for other purposes.	Pub. L. 117–345 (text) (PDF), S. 3519, 136 Stat. 6196, enacted January 5, 2023
117-346	January 5, 2023	(No short title)	To authorize leases of up to 99 years for land held in trust for the Confederated Tribes of the Chehalis Reservation.	Pub. L. 117–346 (text) (PDF), S. 3773, 136 Stat. 6198, enacted January 5, 2023
117-347	January 5, 2023	Abolish Trafficking Reauthorization Act of 2022	To reauthorize the Trafficking Victims Protection Act of 2017, and for other purposes.	Pub. L. 117–347 (text) (PDF), S. 3946, 136 Stat. 6199, enacted January 5, 2023
117-348	January 5, 2023	Trafficking Victims Prevention and Protection Reauthorization Act of 2022	To reauthorize the Trafficking Victims Protection Act of 2000, and for other purposes.	Pub. L. 117–348 (text) (PDF), S. 3949, 136 Stat. 6211, enacted January 5, 2023
117-349	January 5, 2023	Hualapai Tribe Water Rights Settlement Act of 2022	To approve the settlement of water rights claims of the Hualapai Tribe and certain allottees in the State of Arizona, to authorize construction of a water project relating to those water rights claims, and for other purposes.	Pub. L. 117–349 (text) (PDF), S. 4104, 136 Stat. 6225, enacted January 5, 2023
117-350	January 5, 2023	Childhood Cancer Survivorship, Treatment, Access, and Research Reauthorization Act of 2022	To maximize discovery, and accelerate development and availability, of promising childhood cancer treatments, and for other purposes.	Pub. L. 117–350 (text) (PDF), S. 4120, 136 Stat. 6262, enacted January 5, 2023
117-351	January 5, 2023	Justice for Victims of War Crimes Act	To amend section 2441 of title 18, United States Code, to broaden the scope of individuals subject to prosecution for war crimes.	Pub. L. 117–351 (text) (PDF), S. 4240, 136 Stat. 6265, enacted January 5, 2023
117-352	January 5, 2023	(No short title)	To designate the facility of the United States Postal Service located at 5302 Galveston Road in Houston, Texas, as the "Vanessa Guillén Post Office Building".	Pub. L. 117–352 (text) (PDF), S. 4411, 136 Stat. 6267, enacted January 5, 2023
117-353	January 5, 2023	Katimiîn and Ameekyáaraam Sacred Lands Act	To take certain Federal land located in Siskiyou County, California, and Humboldt County, California, into trust for the benefit of the Karuk Tribe, and for other purposes.	Pub. L. 117–353 (text) (PDF), S. 4439, 136 Stat. 6268, enacted January 5, 2023
117-354	January 5, 2023	Respect for Child Survivors Act	To reauthorize the Virginia Graeme Baker Pool and Spa Safety Act, and for other purposes.	Pub. L. 117–354 (text) (PDF), S. 4296, 136 Stat. 6270, enacted January 5, 2023
117-355	January 5, 2023	National Cemeteries Preservation and Protection Act of 2022	To amend title 38, United States Code, to address green burial sections in national cemeteries, and for other purposes.	Pub. L. 117–355 (text) (PDF), S. 4949, 136 Stat. 6278, enacted January 5, 2023
117-356	January 5, 2023	State Offices of Rural Health Program Reauthorization Act of 2022	To amend the Public Health Service Act to reauthorize the State offices of rural health program.	Pub. L. 117–356 (text) (PDF), S. 4978, 136 Stat. 6282, enacted January 5, 2023
117-357	January 5, 2023	Colonel Mary Louise Rasmuson Campus of the Alaska VA Healthcare System Act of 2022	To designate the medical center of the Department of Veterans Affairs located in Anchorage, Alaska, as the "Colonel Mary Louise Rasmuson Campus of the Alaska VA Healthcare System", and for other purposes.	Pub. L. 117–357 (text) (PDF), S. 5016, 136 Stat. 6283, enacted January 5, 2023
117-358	January 5, 2023	Don Young Recognition Act	To designate Mount Young in the State of Alaska, and for other purposes.	Pub. L. 117–358 (text) (PDF), S. 5066, 136 Stat. 6286, enacted January 5, 2023
117-359	January 5, 2023	(No short title)	To amend the Not Invisible Act of 2019 to extend, and provide additional support for, the activities of the Department of the Interior and the Department of Justice Joint Commission on Reducing Violent Crime Against Indians, and for other purposes.	Pub. L. 117–359 (text) (PDF), S. 5087, 136 Stat. 6290, enacted January 5, 2023
117-360	January 5, 2023	Energy Security and Lightering Independence Act of 2022	To amend the Immigration and Nationality Act to include aliens passing in transit through the United States to board a vessel on which the alien will perform ship-to-ship liquid cargo transfer operations within a class of nonimmigrant aliens, and for other purposes.	Pub. L. 117–360 (text) (PDF), S. 5168, 136 Stat. 6292, enacted January 5, 2023
117-361	January 5, 2023	(No short title)	To amend the Farm Security and Rural Investment Act of 2002 to extend terminal lakes assistance.	Pub. L. 117–361 (text) (PDF), S. 5328, 136 Stat. 6294, enacted January 5, 2023
117-362	January 5, 2023	(No short title)	To amend the Bill Emerson Good Samaritan Food Donation Act to improve the program, and for other purposes.	Pub. L. 117–362 (text) (PDF), S. 5329, 136 Stat. 6295, enacted January 5, 2023

== Private laws ==
Private law number	Date of enactment	Official title	Link
117-1	December 27, 2022	For the relief of Rebecca Trimble.	Pvt. L. 117–1 (text) (PDF), H.R. 681, enacted December 27, 2022
117-2	December 27, 2022	For the relief of Maria Isabel Bueso Barrera, Alberto Bueso Mendoza, and Karla Maria Barrera De Bueso.	Pvt. L. 117–2 (text) (PDF), H.R. 785, enacted December 27, 2022
117-3	January 5, 2023	For the relief of Arpita Kurdekar, Girish Kurdekar, and Vandana Kurdekar.	Pvt. L. 117–3 (text) (PDF), H.R. 680, enacted January 5, 2023

== Treaties ratified ==
The following treaties have been ratified in the 117th Congress:

Treaty document number	Date of ratification	Short title	Senate vote
Treaty 117-1	September 21, 2022	Amendment to the Montreal Protocol on Substances that Deplete the Ozone Layer, adopted at Kigali on October 15, 2016, by the Twenty-Eighth Meeting of the Parties to the Montreal Protocol (the "Kigali Amendment")	69-27
Treaty 117-3	August 3, 2022	Protocol to the North Atlantic Treaty of 1949 on the Accession of the Republic of Finland and the Kingdom of Sweden	95-1

== See also ==
- List of bills in the 117th United States Congress
- List of United States federal legislation
- Lists of acts of the United States Congress
- 2020s in United States political history
