= Secure and Trusted Communications Networks Act of 2019 =

United States legislation protecting U.S. networks and supply chains

- Long title: To prohibit certain Federal subsidies from being used to purchase communications equipment or services posing national security risks, to provide for the establishment of a reimbursement program for the replacement of communications equipment or services posing such risks, and for other purposes.
- Enacted by: the 116th United States Congress
- Effective: March 12, 2020

Citations
- Public law: Pub. L. 116–124 (text) (PDF)
- Statutes at Large: 134 Stat. 158

Legislative history
- Introduced in the House of Representatives as H.R. 4998 the Secure and Trusted Communications Networks Act of 2019 by Frank Pallone, Jr. (D–NJ) on November 8, 2019; Committee consideration by House Energy and Commerce; Passed the House on December 16, 2019; Passed the Senate as the Secure and Trusted Communications Networks Act of 2019 on February 27, 2020; Signed into law by President Donald Trump on March 12, 2020

The Secure and Trusted Communications Networks Act of 2019, also known as the Secure Networks Act (Pub.L.116-124, 134 Stat. 158, H.R.4998), is a U.S. federal statute enacted by the 116th United States Congress and signed into law by President Donald Trump on March 12, 2020. The law establishes a mechanism to prevent communications equipment or services that pose a national security risk from entering U.S. networks, and a program to remove any such equipment or services currently used in U.S. networks.

== Background ==
In April 2018, the U.S.-China Economic and Security Review Commission concluded in its supply chain report that the Chinese Government had "invested significant state capital and influence'' on state-owned enterprises to strategically place these companies in the U.S. communications supply chain.

In May 2019, the United States Department of Commerce identified Chinese company Huawei Technologies Co. Ltd (Huawei) and its 70 affiliates as posing significant threats to U.S. commercial and security interests.

Unlike large communications companies, smaller U.S. carriers with more limited resources and less sophisticated security operations have purchased and installed Huawei and other foreign equipment in their networks, either due to the low cost or a lack of awareness of the security risks.

== Procedural History ==
H.R. 4998 was introduced in the U.S. House of Representatives on November 8, 2019, by Rep. Frank Pallone (D-NJ-6). On December 16, 2019, the House considered the bill under suspension of the rules and passed it. The U.S. Senate passed the bill by voice vote on February 27, 2020. The bill was presented to President Donald Trump on March 3, 2020, and signed into law on March 12, 2020.

== Provisions ==
The law, codified in 47 U.S. Code § 1601, prohibits the use of federal funds to purchase communications equipment or services from companies that pose a national security risk to U.S. communications networks. The Federal Communications Commission (FCC) must publish and maintain a list of such equipment or services, including those from Huawei Technologies Co. Limited, Zhongxing Telecommunications Equipment Corporation (ZTE), and their affiliates. The law also establishes a program to reimburse small U.S. communications providers with 2 million or fewer customers for removing prohibited equipment or services from their networks and replacing them with more secure alternatives.

== Impact ==
On June 30, 2020, under the authority of the Secure and Trusted Communications Networks Act of 2019, the FCC issued orders designating Huawei, ZTE, and their affiliates as "covered companies," meaning they were identified as threats to U.S. national security. This designation banned the use of federal funds to purchase products and services from these companies.

== See also ==
- United States sanctions against China
- Secure Equipment Act of 2021
