= Secure Equipment Act =

United States legislation protecting U.S. networks and supply chains

Secure Equipment Act of 2021
- Long title: To ensure that the Federal Communications Commission prohibits authorization of radio frequency devices that pose a national security risk.
- Enacted by: the 117th United States Congress
- Effective: November 11, 2021

Citations
- Public law: Pub. L. 117–55 (text) (PDF)
- Statutes at Large: 135 Stat. 423

Legislative history
- Introduced in the House of Representatives as H.R. 3919 the Secure Equipment Act of 2021 by Steve Scalise (R–LA) on June 15, 2021; Committee consideration by House Energy and Commerce; Passed the House on October 20, 2021 (420–4); Passed the Senate on October 28, 2021 (Unanimous consent); Signed into law by President Joe Biden on November 1, 2021

The Secure Equipment Act of 2021 (Pub.L.117-55, H.R.3919, 135 Stat. 423) is a U.S. federal statute enacted by the 117th United States Congress and signed into law by President Joe Biden on November 11, 2021. This law requires the U.S. Federal Communications Commission (FCC) to issue rules stating that it will no longer review or approve any authorization application for equipment that poses an unacceptable risk to national security.

== Background and provisions ==
In March 2021, the FCC identified five Chinese companies as threats to national security under the Secure and Trusted Communications Networks Act of 2019 to protect U.S. communications networks. The companies included Huawei, ZTE, Hytera Communications, Hangzhou Hikvision Digital Technology, and Zhejiang Dahua Technology.

In June 2021, the FCC issued new rules which would prohibit all future authorizations of telecommunications and video surveillance equipment from the five companies due to “an unacceptable risk” to U.S. national security. FCC Commissioner Brendan Carr stated that since 2018, the FCC had approved over 3,000 applications from Huawei. He said the Secure Equipment Act would "help to ensure that insecure gear from companies like Huawei and ZTE can no longer be inserted into America's communications networks."

The law, codified in 47 U.S. Code § 1601, mandates that the FCC establish rules that “clarify” that FCC will “no longer review or approve” authorizations for any equipment on the FCC's list of "covered communications equipment or services" deemed to pose a security risk. This list focuses on equipment identified as a threat to national security or the safety of U.S. citizens.

== Procedural history ==
H.R.3919 was introduced into the U.S. House of Representatives on June 15, 2021, by Rep. Steve Scalise (R-LA) with 22 cosponsors.

On October 19, 2021, the House considered the bill under suspension of the rules, requiring a two-thirds majority. It passed 420–4 on October 20, 2021.

The U.S. Senate passed the bill without amendments by unanimous consent on October 28, 2021.

The bill was presented to President Biden on November 3, 2021, and signed into law on November 11, 2021.

== Impact ==
The Secure Equipment Act is viewed as blocking Chinese telecommunications firms like Huawei and ZTE from obtaining new equipment licenses from the U.S. government.

To implement the law, on November 25, 2022, the FCC finalized rules banning the approval of new telecommunications equipment from Huawei, ZTE, Dahua Technology, Hikvision, and Hytera Communications, citing unacceptable risks to U.S. national security.

== See also ==
- List of acts of the 117th United States Congress
- Secure and Trusted Communications Networks Act of 2019
