= Biren Technology =

Chinese semiconductor company

- Type: Public
- Traded as: SEHK: 6082
- Industry: Semiconductors
- Founded: 2019; 7 years ago
- Founders: Lingjie Xu and others
- Headquarters: Shanghai, China
- Products: BR100, BR104
- Website: www.birentech.com

Biren Technology
- Simplified Chinese: 上海壁仞科技股份有限公司
- Traditional Chinese: 上海壁仞科技股份有限公司
Transcriptions
Standard Mandarin
- Hanyu Pinyin: Shànghǎi Bìrèn Kējì Gǔfèn Yǒuxiàn Gōngsī

Shanghai Biren Intelligent Technology Co. (Chinese: 壁仞科技; pinyin: Bìrèn Kējì) is a Chinese fabless semiconductor design company. The company was founded in 2019 by Lingjie Xu and others, all of whom were previously employed at NVIDIA, Alibaba and STMicroelectronics. Biren has advertised two general-purpose graphics processing units (GPGPUs), the BR100 and BR104. Both cards are aimed at artificial intelligence and high-performance computing. The company is subjected to US sanctions due to security concerns.

== History ==
Founded in 2019, Biren was co-founded by former tech employees including Zhang Wen, former president at SenseTime, and Jiao Guofang, a former employee at Huawei. It gained attention in 2022 by launching its BR100 chip, claiming performance comparable to NVIDIA's H100 processor. Their general-purpose GPU products are used in multiple intelligent computing centers including those from China Mobile and China Telecom.

Due to the losses following the US sanction in 2023, Xu Lingjie, one of its co-founders, left the company.

On 2 January 2026, Biren held its initial public offering on the Hong Kong Stock Exchange to become a listed company.

== Funding ==
After US sanctions in October 2022, the company secured a 280 million USD pledge from Guangzhou government-backed investors. In September 2024, the company hired an investment bank to begin its IPO tutoring process. The company also received funding from a private equity firm under the Shanghai State-owned Capital Investment (SSCI) in March 2025. As of June 2025, the company managed to raise 1.5 billion yuan in funding due to state-linked investors.

== US sanctions ==
As a result of US sanctions effective in October 2022 regarding exportation of advanced computing devices and manufacturing materials, Biren's contracted semiconductor manufacturer Taiwan Semiconductor Manufacturing Company (TSMC) halted all manufacturing of the company's products. In an apparent effort to get around a stipulation of the US sanctions, Biren reportedly modified its BR100 GPU to be able to process less data, so that it would not qualify for restriction for its manufacturer, TSMC.

In October 2023, the United States Department of Commerce added Biren Technology to the Bureau of Industry and Security's Entity List.

== See also ==
- CHIPS and Science Act
- Lisuan Tech
- Moore Threads
- Semiconductor industry in China
