= Moore Threads =

Chinese fabless semiconductor company

Moore Threads Technology Co. Ltd
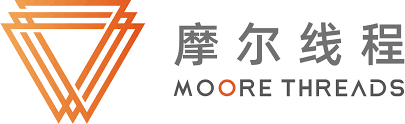
- Native name: 摩尔线程
- Type: Public
- Traded as: SSE: 688795
- Industry: GPUs
- Founded: October 2020; 5 years ago
- Headquarters: Beijing, China
- Key people: Zhang Jianzhong (CEO)
- Website: www.mthreads.com

Moore Threads Technology Co. Ltd (Chinese: 摩尔线程) is a Chinese company specializing in graphics processing unit (GPU) design.

== History ==
The company was founded in October 2020 by Zhang Jianzhong, former global vice president and general manager of Nvidia's Chinese branch. It was co-founded by Zhang Yubo. It received funding from investors including Shenzhen Capital Group, GGV Capital, Sequoia Capital China, ByteDance, and Tencent.

On 5 December 2025, Moore Threads held its initial public offering on the Shanghai Stock Exchange raising over US$1 billion. It jumped 468% on its trading debut. Liang Wenfeng, founder of High-Flyer and DeepSeek, was listed as the top institutional investor.

In August 2026, Moore Threads announced it was seeking a secondary listing on the Hong Kong Stock Exchange.

=== U.S. sanctions ===
In October 2023, the United States Department of Commerce added Moore Threads to the Bureau of Industry and Security's Entity List.

== Products ==
On 31 March 2022, it announced its first products, the MTT S60 for desktop PCs and workstations, and the MTT S2000 for servers, based on the first generation MUSA (Moore Threads Unified System Architecture, also known as "苏堤").

	S60	S80	S2000
Manufacturing process	12 nm		
FP32 ALUs	2,048	4,096	
Theoretical performance (TFlops FP32)	6	14.4	12
VRAM capacity	8 GB	16 GB	32 GB
VRAM type	LPDDR4X	GDDR6	
Form factor (Reference design)	Single-slot	Dual-slot	
API support	DirectX, Vulkan, OpenGL, OpenGL ES		
OS support	Microsoft Windows, Linux		
Platform support	x86, x86-64, Aarch32, Aarch64, LoongArch		
Display support	HDMI 2.1, DisplayPort 1.4		

== See also ==
- Biren Technology
- Lisuan Tech
- Semiconductor industry in China
