= National Register of Historic Places listings in Wayne County, Pennsylvania =

Location of Wayne County in Pennsylvania

This is a list of the National Register of Historic Places listings in Wayne County, Pennsylvania.

This is intended to be a complete list of the properties and districts on the National Register of Historic Places in Wayne County, Pennsylvania, United States. The locations of National Register properties and districts for which the latitude and longitude coordinates are included below, may be seen in a map.

There are 18 properties and districts listed on the National Register in the county. One site is further designated as a National Historic Landmark.

This National Park Service list is complete through NPS recent listings posted March 14, 2025.

== Current listings ==
	Name on the Register	Image	Date listed	Location	Municipality	Description
1	Bellemonte Silk Mill	Bellemonte Silk Mill	June 28, 2010 (#10000407)	230 Welwood Ave. 41°28′19″N 75°10′20″W	Hawley	
2	Bethany Presbyterian Church		December 13, 2024 (#100010411)	431 Wayne Street; 41°36′54″N 75°17′13″W	Bethany	
3	Bridge in Dreher Township	Bridge in Dreher Township	June 22, 1988 (#88000871)	Legislative Route 171 over Haags Mill Creek; 41°17′17″N 75°19′52″W	Dreher Township	
4	Damascus Historic District	Damascus Historic District	August 14, 1992 (#92001000)	Roughly Pennsylvania Route 371 from Galilee Road to the Delaware River and adjacent part of Route 63027 south of Pennsylvania Route 371; 41°42′37″N 75°04′15″W	Damascus Township	
5	Delaware and Hudson Canal	Delaware and Hudson Canal	November 24, 1968 (#68000051)	Delaware and Hudson Canal; 41°34′20″N 75°15′21″W	Honesdale	Extends into Pike County; Wayne County component is the company's former offices in Honesdale
6	Eugene Dorflinger Estate	Eugene Dorflinger Estate	September 18, 1978 (#78002483)	U.S. Route 6 and Charles Street in White Mills; 41°31′32″N 75°12′12″W	Texas Township	
7	Equinunk Historic District	Equinunk Historic District	November 12, 1999 (#99001336)	Generally following Pennsylvania Route 191, Pine Mill, Lordville, and Grocery Hill Roads in Equinunk; 41°51′18″N 75°13′37″W	Buckingham and Manchester Townships	
8	Hill's Sawmill	Hill's Sawmill	November 8, 1974 (#74001816)	South of Equinunk off Pennsylvania Route 191; 41°45′09″N 75°11′36″W	Damascus Township	
9	Honesdale Residential Historic District	Honesdale Residential Historic District	February 6, 1998 (#97001670)	Roughly bounded by the Lackawaxen River, Dyberry Creek, the Dyberry Cemetery, and Overlook and 18th Streets; 41°34′51″N 75°15′35″W	Honesdale	
10	Lacawac	Lacawac	August 9, 1979 (#79002367)	East of Ledgedale; 41°22′43″N 75°17′40″W	Paupack and Salem Townships	
11	Milanville Historic District	Milanville Historic District	April 29, 1993 (#93000352)	Roughly Legislative Route 63027 from the junction with Legislative Route 63029 east to Skinner's Falls Bridge via Bridge Approach Road, in Milanville; 41°40′16″N 75°03′48″W	Damascus Township	
12	Milanville-Skinners Falls Bridge	Milanville-Skinners Falls Bridge	November 14, 1988 (#88002167)	Legislative Route 63027 over the Delaware River at Milanville; 41°40′10″N 75°03′31″W	Damascus Township	Extends into Cochecton in Sullivan County, New York
13	J.S. O'Connor American Rich Cut Glassware Factory	J.S. O'Connor American Rich Cut Glassware Factory	March 23, 2005 (#05000206)	120 Falls Avenue; 41°28′31″N 75°10′17″W	Hawley	
14	Octagon Stone Schoolhouse	Octagon Stone Schoolhouse	May 6, 1977 (#77001200)	1 mile (1.6 km) southwest of South Canaan; 41°29′42″N 75°25′53″W	South Canaan Township	
15	Patriotic Order Sons of America Washington Camp 422	Patriotic Order Sons of America Washington Camp 422	December 27, 2010 (#10001068)	465 South Sterling Road; 41°16′28″N 75°20′11″W	Dreher Township	
16	Starlight Station, New York, Ontario, and Western Railway	Starlight Station, New York, Ontario, and Western Railway	August 30, 2001 (#01000925)	O&W Road northeast of Depot Hill Road, Starlight; 41°54′14″N 75°19′46″W	Buckingham Township	
17	Wilmot House	Wilmot House	February 15, 1974 (#74001815)	Wayne Street; 41°36′46″N 75°17′03″W	Bethany	
18	Wilmot Mansion	Wilmot Mansion	January 26, 1978 (#78003172)	Wayne and Sugar Streets; 41°36′47″N 75°17′06″W	Bethany	

== Former listing ==
	Name on the Register	Image	Date listed	Date removed	Location	Municipality	Description
1	Stone Arch Bridge		October 21, 1977 (#77001201)	June 27, 1986	Starrucca Creek	Starrucca	

== See also ==
- List of Pennsylvania state historical markers in Wayne County
