= Dreher =

Dreher may refer to:

- Dreher (surname)
- Dreher Brewery, brewery in Budapest, Hungary
- Dreher Township, Wayne County, Pennsylvania, township in Pennsylvania
- Bridge in Dreher Township, bridge in Dreher Township, Wayne County, Pennsylvania
- Dreher Island State Recreation Area, park in South Carolina
- Dreher High School, high school in Columbia, South Carolina
- Jacob Wingard Dreher House, historic home in Lexington County, South Carolina
- Dreher Shoals Dam, dam in Lexington County, South Carolina

== See also ==
- Brooklyn (cycling team), a cycling team that used the name Dreher from 1970 to 1972
