= List of Pennsylvania state historical markers in Wayne County =

Location of Wayne County in Pennsylvania

This is a list of the Pennsylvania state historical markers in Wayne County.

This is intended to be a complete list of the official state historical markers placed in Wayne County, Pennsylvania by the Pennsylvania Historical and Museum Commission (PHMC). The locations of the historical markers, as well as the latitude and longitude coordinates as provided by the PHMC's database, are included below when available. There are 15 historical markers located in Wayne County.

== Historical markers ==
Marker title	Image	Date dedicated	Location	Marker type	Topics
Cushetunk		May 28, 1947	SR 1004 N of Milanville (MISSING)	Roadside	American Revolution, Early Settlement, Government & Politics, Government & Politics 18th Century, Native American
David Wilmot		July 27, 1948	PA 670 1.6 mi. NW of PA 90, Honesdale (Missing); 41.61265°N 75.28388°W	Roadside	Government & Politics, Government & Politics 19th Century, Writers
David Wilmot		May 29, 1947	395 Old Wayne St., S of Sugar St., off Pa. 670 at Bethany, not accessible from "new" Wayne St. (a private drive)	Roadside	African American, Government & Politics, Government & Politics 19th Century
Delaware & Hudson Canal		May 28, 1947	Main St. (US 6) & 8th St., at historical society, Honesdale; 41.57222°N 75.25555°W	Roadside	Canals, Coal, Navigation, Railroads, Transportation
Dorflinger Glass Works		June 28, 1951	Main St. (US 6 - Texas Palmyra Hwy.) & Elizabeth St. at S end of White Mills; 41.52642°N 75.20353°W	Roadside	Business & Industry, Glass
Honesdale		April 9, 1948	Grandview Ave. (US 6) near #20, at billboard, SE of Honesdale; 41.55642°N 75.24068°W	Roadside	Canals, Cities & Towns, Coal, Professions & Vocations, Transportation
Honesdale		April 9, 1948	W Park St. (US 6) & Meadow Ln. west of Honesdale (on left heading west); 41.57756°N 75.27254°W	Roadside	Cities & Towns
Lincoln Nomination		August 26, 1968	115 9th St., Honesdale; 41.57336°N 75.25586°W	Roadside	Abraham Lincoln, Government & Politics, Government & Politics 19th Century
Pennsylvania		n/a	PA 191 between PA 370 and the state line (Missing)	Roadside	Government & Politics, Government & Politics 17th Century, William Penn
Samuel Meredith		July 28, 1948	Great Bend Turnpk. (PA 371) & Bethany Turnpk. (PA 670) at fork, Pleasant Mount (near Welcome sign); 41.74°N 75.43433°W	Roadside	American Revolution, Government & Politics, Government & Politics 18th Century
Samuel Meredith		October 21, 1949	PA 371/670 (Great Bend Trnpk.) & Belmont and Easton Trnpk. at Belmont Corner W of Pleasant Mount; 41.74051°N 75.45615°W	Roadside	Government & Politics, Government & Politics 18th Century
Sarah Mary Benjamin		May 30, 1992	Old Newburgh Trnpk. / Great Bend Trnpk. (PA 371) at Brannigan Rd., just S of Pleasant Mount (West Hill), near N-E PA Phone Co. 41.73999°N 75.43925°W	Roadside	American Revolution, Military, Women
Stourbridge Lion		May 28, 1947	US 6 / PA 191 (Main St.) at Park St., Honesdale, by bridge 41.57693°N 75.25835°W	Roadside	Railroads, Transportation
Stourbridge Lion		n/a	Main St. (US 6) & 8th St., at historical soc., Honesdale; 41.57223°N 75.25554°W	Roadside	Railroads, Transportation
Wayne County		July 8, 1981	County Courthouse, 925 Court St., Honesdale; 41.57455°N 75.25407°W	City	Government & Politics, Government & Politics 18th Century

== See also ==
- List of Pennsylvania state historical markers
- National Register of Historic Places listings in Wayne County, Pennsylvania
