= White Mills, Pennsylvania =

Unincorporated community in Pennsylvania, US

- Village; Census-designated place
- Village of White Mills
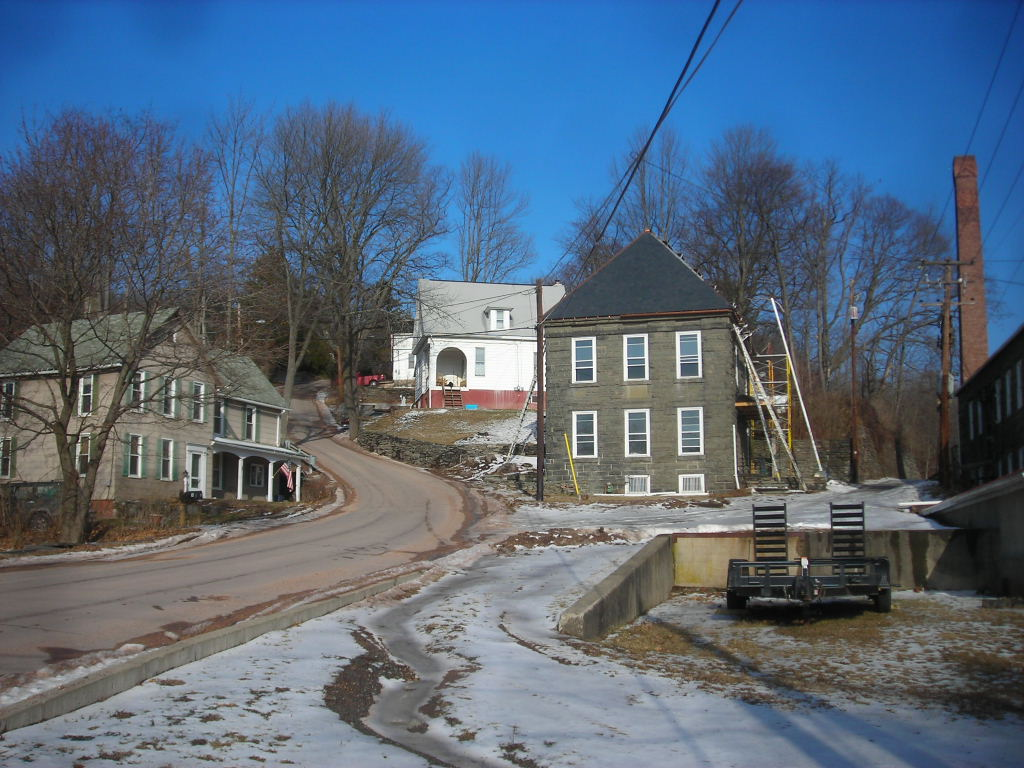
- A 2008 view of White Mills Road, showing the Dorflinger factory office and factory at the right. The Dorflinger buildings have now been restored.
- Nickname: White's Mills
- Location in Wayne County and the state of Pennsylvania.
- Country: United States
- State: Pennsylvania
- U.S. Congressional District: PA-10
- School Districts: Wayne Highlands (Region III); Wallenpaupack Area
- County: Wayne
- Magisterial District: 22-3-02
- Township: Texas

Area
  - Total: 1.516 sq mi (3.927 km^{2})
  - Land: 1.483 sq mi (3.840 km^{2})
  - Water: 0.034 sq mi (0.087 km^{2})
- Elevation: 948 ft (289 m)

Population (2010)
  - Total: 659
  - Density: 450/sq mi (172/km^{2})
- Time zone: UTC-5 (Eastern (EST))
  - Summer (DST): UTC-4 (Eastern Daylight (EDT))
- ZIP code: 18473
- Area code: 570
- GNIS feature IDs: 1191289 (Village); 2631315 (CDP)
- FIPS code: 42-84696
- Waterways: Butcher Pond, Lackawaxen River

White Mills is a village and census-designated place that is located in Texas Township, Pennsylvania, United States. The CDP's population was 659 at the time of the 2010 United States Census.

White Mills is located on U.S. Route 6 in the eastern part of Wayne County.

== History ==
In 1803, Jonathan Brink of Milford, Pennsylvania, purchased the Haines property and erected one of the early sawmills just below White Mills.

Sometime around 1823, a sawmill was erected on the Lackawaxen River, near where the Chroma Tube factory stands today. At the time, the area between Honesdale and Hawley, Pennsylvania, was sparsely settled, though it is likely that several farms and dwellings dotted the surrounding vicinity. The new mill, built for a Daniel Parry (sometimes spelled Perry) & Company of Philadelphia, and its ancillary buildings were all painted white, which led to the village being called "White Mills."

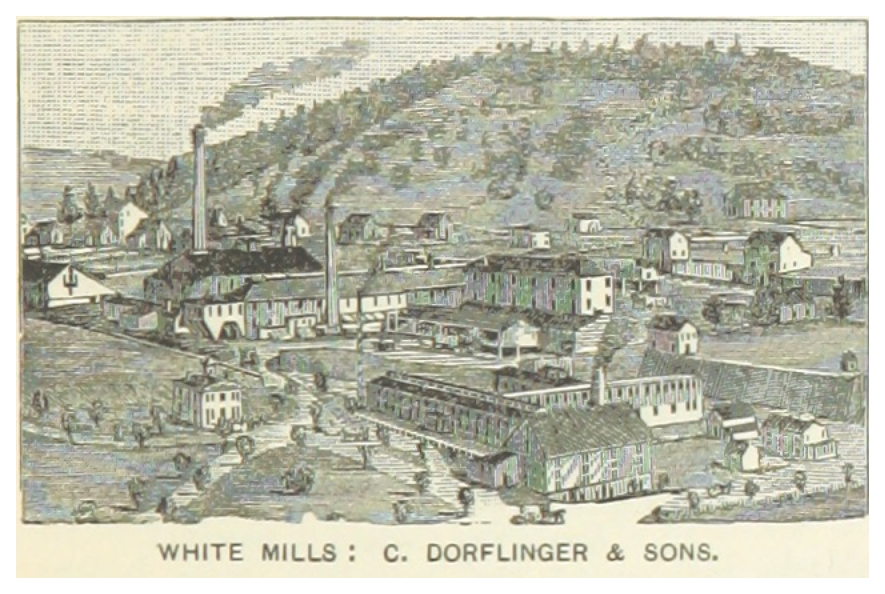
A view of White Mills during its time as a Dorflinger company town

In 1865, Christian Dorflinger, a French-speaking Alsatian immigrant, opened a glass factory in White Mills. Dorflinger had arrived in the United States in 1846 and established a prosperous glass company based in Brooklyn in 1852, but decided to build a dedicated factory and company town for the Dorflinger Glass Company at White Mills, in order to escape the pollution and violence of New York at the time. At White Mills, Dorflinger and his sons built a sprawling factory complex and more than one hundred houses for workers and their families.

The town was populated, in large part, by craftsman whom Dorflinger invited from Europe to work at the factory. Dorflinger Glass produced fine cut lead crystal that was used in the White House services of the Lincoln and Harrison administrations, and at prominent occasions such as the weddings of William Vanderbilt and Nellie Grant.

Production at the factory continued until 1921, when pressures related to prohibition and lingering effects of an embargo on German potash forced the company to cease operations. Upon the factory's closing, White Mills lost much of its population.

In 2017, the remaining Dorflinger Glass Factory buildings were restored and turned into a museum.

== Geography ==
According to the United States Census Bureau, White Mills has a total area of 1.517 mi^{2} (3.93 km^{2}), of which 1.483 mi^{2} (3.84 km^{2}) is land and 0.034 mi^{2} (0.088 km^{2}), or 2.2%, is water.

== Demographics ==
As of the Census of 2010, there were 659 people, 280 households, and 191 families in White Mills. The CDP's population density was 444 inhabitants per square mile (171/km^{2}), and there were 325 housing units at an average density of 214 units per square mile (83 units/km^{2}).

The racial makeup of the populace was 96.7% White, 1.1% African American, 1.1% Native American, 0.2% Asian, 0.0% Pacific Islander, 0.5% of other races, and 0.6% of two or more races. Hispanics and Latinos of all races made up 3.0% of the population.

68.2% of White Mills' households were families, 48.9% were headed by a heterosexual married couple (Pennsylvania did not allow same-sex marriage until May 20, 2014, after the 2010 Census had been completed), and 28.6% included children under the age of 18. 13.2% of households were headed by a female householder with no husband present, 6.1% by a male householder with no wife present, and 31.8% consisted of non-families. 28.2% of all households were made up of individuals, and 12.8% consisted of a person 65 years of age or older living alone. The average household size was 2.35 and the average family size was 2.83.

White Mills' age distribution was 21.1% under the age of 18, 6.8% between the ages of 18 and 24, 21.9% between 25 and 44, 30.7% between 45 and 64, and 19.6% 65 years of age or older. The population's median age was 45.2 years. For every 100 females, there were 97.9 males. For every 100 females age 18 and over, there were 100.0 males in the same age range.

According to American Community Survey (ACS) estimates, the median income for a household in White Mills in 2013 was $50,045, and the median income for a family was $49,531. Males had a median income of $34,250, while females had a median income of $18,239. The per capita income for the CDP was $27,661. 11.8% of families and 14.0% of people were below the Census Bureau's poverty thresholds (different from the federally defined poverty guidelines), including 28.1% of those under age 18 and 0.0% of those age 65 or over.

According to self-reported ancestry figures recorded by the ACS, the five largest ancestral groups in White Mills in 2013 were Germans (40.3%), Irish (25.9%), Italians (18.1%), Americans (12.6%), and Poles (7.5%).

== Education ==
Most of the CDP is in the Wallenpaupack Area School District, while a portion is in the Wayne Highlands School District.
