= Pennsylvania House of Representatives, District 139 =

American legislative district

Pennsylvania's 139th State House of Representatives district
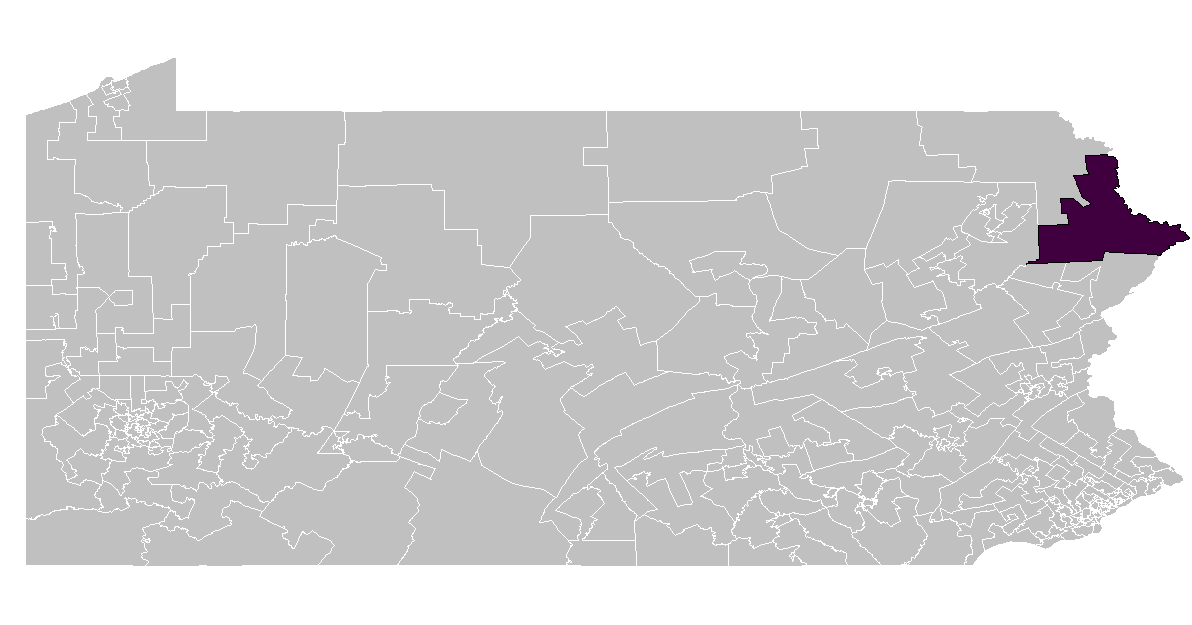
Representative
Jeff Olsommer; R–Hawley
- Demographics: 95.0% White; 1.8% Black; 4.8% Hispanic
- Population (2011) • Citizens of voting age: 63,130; 49,694

The 139th Pennsylvania House of Representatives District is located in Northeastern Pennsylvania and has been represented by Republican Jeff Olsommer since 2024. Olsommer won an April 23, 2024 special election to fill the seat following the February 2024 resignation of Republican Joseph Adams.

== District profile ==
The 139th Pennsylvania House of Representatives District is located in Pike County, Pennsylvania and Wayne County, Pennsylvania. It includes Grey Towers National Historic Site. It is made up of the following areas:

- Pike County, Pennsylvania
  - Blooming Grove Township
  - Dingman Township
  - Greene Township
  - Lackawaxen Township
  - Matamoras
  - Milford
  - Milford Township
  - Palmyra Township
  - Shohola Township
  - Westfall Township
- Wayne County, Pennsylvania
  - Cherry Ridge Township
  - Dreher Township
  - Hawley
  - Lake Township
  - Lehigh Township
  - Palmyra Township
  - Paupack Township
  - Salem Township
  - South Canaan Township
  - Sterling Township

== Representatives ==
Representative	Party	Years	District home	Note
Prior to 1969, seats were apportioned by county.
J. Russell Eshback	Republican	1969–1970		
William W. Foster	Republican	1971–1984		
Jerry Birmelin	Republican	1985–2006	Honesdale	
Michael Peifer	Republican	2007–2023	Greentown	
Joseph Adams	Republican	2023–2024	Hawley	Resigned: February 9, 2024
Jeff Olsommer	Republican	2024–present	Hawley	

== Recent election results ==
PA House special election, 2024: Pennsylvania House, District 139
Party	Candidate	Votes	%
Republican	Jeff Olsommer	7,140	60.32
Democratic	Robin Skibber	4,696	39.68
Total votes		11,836	100.00
Republican hold			

PA House election, 2022: Pennsylvania House, District 139
Party	Candidate	Votes	%
Republican	Joe Adams	16,680	56.95
Democratic	Meg Rosenfeld	9,875	33.71
Write-in		2,735	9.34
Total votes		29,290	100.00
Republican hold			

PA House election, 2020: Pennsylvania House, District 139
Party	Candidate	Votes	%
Republican	Mike Peifer (incumbent)	24,597	68.41
Democratic	Marian Keegan	11,359	31.59
Total votes		35,956	100.00
Republican hold			

PA House election, 2018: Pennsylvania House, District 139
Party	Candidate	Votes	%
Republican	Mike Peifer (incumbent)	17,048	68.46
Democratic	Orlando Marrero	7,853	31.54
Total votes		24,901	100.00
Republican hold			

PA House election, 2016: Pennsylvania House, District 139
Party	Candidate	Votes	%
Republican	Mike Peifer (incumbent)	Unopposed	
Total votes		23,521	100.00
Republican hold			
