= Damascus Township, Wayne County, Pennsylvania =

Township in Pennsylvania, US

Damascus, Pennsylvania
- Second-class township
- Township of Damascus
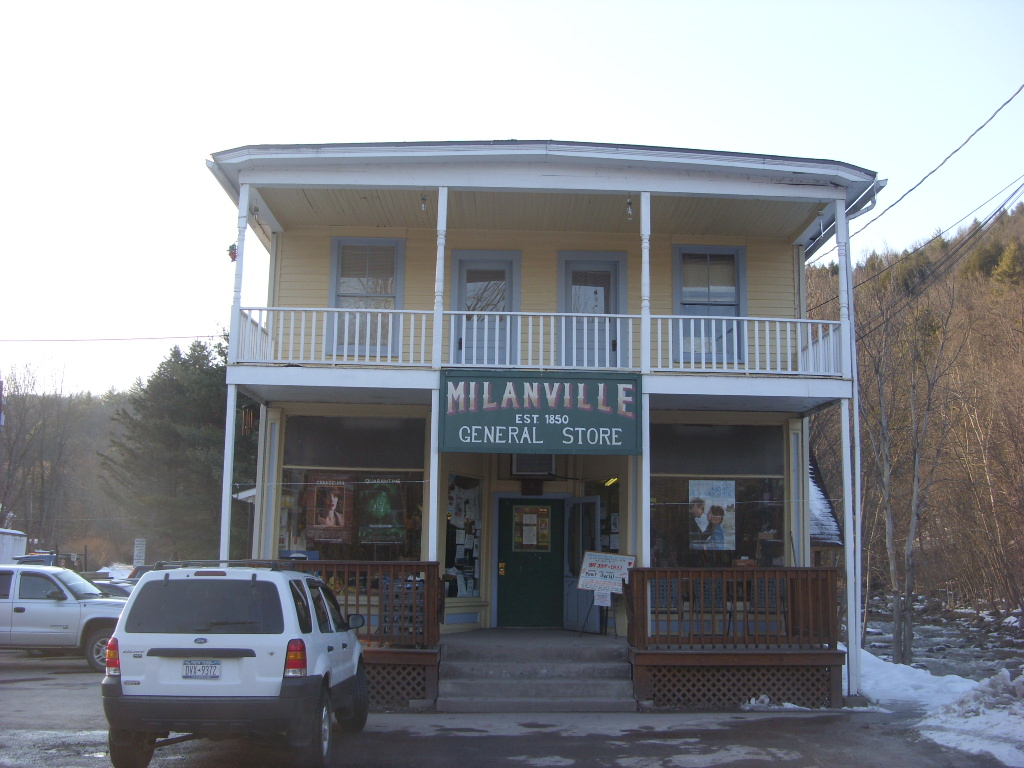
- The Milanville General Store in Milanville.

- Seal

- Location in Wayne County and the state of Pennsylvania.
- Country: United States
- State: Pennsylvania
- US Congressional District: PA-8
- State Senatorial District: 20
- State House of Representatives District: 139
- County: Wayne
- School District: Wayne Highlands; Region I
- First settlement: 1670
- First permanent settlement: 1855
- Incorporated: March 21, 1798 (original township of Wayne County)
- Founded by: Joseph Skinner
- Named after: Damascus, Syria

Government
  - Type: Board of Supervisors
  - Board of Supervisors: Supervisors: Jeffrey R. Dexter (Chairman); Steven R. Adams (Vice-Chairman); Joseph K. Canfield
  - US Representative: Matt Cartwright (D)
  - State Senator: Lisa Baker (R)
  - State Representative: Michael Peifer (R)

Area
  - Total: 80.28 sq mi (207.92 km^{2})
  - Land: 78.70 sq mi (203.83 km^{2})
  - Water: 1.58 sq mi (4.09 km^{2})
- Elevation: 1,283 ft (391 m)

Population (2020)
  - Total: 3,674
  - Density: 46.7/sq mi (18.03/km^{2})
- Time zone: UTC-5 (Eastern (EST))
  - Summer (DST): UTC-4 (Eastern Daylight (EDT))
- Area code: 570
- GNIS feature ID: 1217217
- FIPS code: 42-127-18104
- Website: Damascus Township

Damascus is a second-class township in Wayne County, Pennsylvania, United States. The township's population was 3,659 at the time of the 2020 United States Census.

== History ==
Damascus Township is the fifth and largest of the original townships created with the establishment of Wayne County in 1798. It remains the largest despite the fact that the entire townships of Lebanon and Oregon and portions of Dyberry and Berlin Townships were excised from its territory. Damascus was the setting for many significant historic events in Wayne County history beginning with the first settlement at Cushetunk along the Delaware River. Joseph Skinner and his family of eight children were among the earliest of the Connecticut settlers who arrived about 1755 although unsubstantiated stories place Moses Thomas there as early as 1750. At the time ownership of this area of northeastern Pennsylvania was in dispute because King Charles II had granted a charter to Connecticut in 1662 and in 1681 he granted a charter to William Penn and the boundaries of each charter overlapped. In addition, these early inhabitants were also beset by attacks by Indians who also laid claim to the territory.

The Damascus Historic District, Milanville Historic District, Hill's Sawmill, and Milanville-Skinners Falls Bridge are listed on the National Register of Historic Places.

== Geography ==
According to the United States Census Bureau, the township has a total area of 80.3 square miles (208 km^{2}), of which 78.7 square miles (204 km^{2}) is land and 1.6 square miles (4.1 km^{2}) (1.97%) is water.

The eastern township boundary is the Delaware River, which also forms the border with the state of New York. The Callicoon, Cochecton–Damascus and Skinners Falls–Milanville bridges connect the township with the towns of Delaware and Cochecton in Sullivan County across the river.

== Communities ==
The following villages are located in Damascus Township:

- Abrahamsville
- Atco (also called Branningville)
- Boyds Mills (also called Boyd's Mills or Tymmerson's Mills)
- Calkins
- Conklin Hill
- Damascus (also called Shields Mills)
- Darbytown
- Fallsdale
- Galilee
- Hilltown
- Milanville
- Rutledgdale (also called Rutledgedale)
- Stanton Corner
- Tyler Hill
- West Damascus

== Demographics ==
Historical population
Census	Pop.	Note	%±
2010	3,659		—
2020	3,674		0.4%
U.S. Decennial Census

As of the census of 2010, there were 3,659 people, 1,588 households, and 1,060 families residing in the township. The population density was 46.5 inhabitants per square mile (18.0/km^{2}). There were 2,296 housing units at an average density of 29.2 per square mile (11.3/km^{2}). The racial makeup of the township was 97.7% White, 0.5% African American, 0.1% Native American, 0.4% Asian, 0.2% from other races, and 1.1% from two or more races. Hispanic or Latino of any race were 2.2% of the population.

There were 1,588 households, out of which 23.3% had children under the age of 18 living with them, 56.6% were married couples living together, 6.5% had a female householder with no husband present, and 33.2% were non-families. 29.2% of all households were made up of individuals, and 13.5% had someone living alone who was 65 years of age or older. The average household size was 2.30 and the average family size was 2.82.

In the township the population was spread out, with 20.6% under the age of 18, 58% from 18 to 64, and 21.4% who were 65 years of age or older. The median age was 48 years.

The median income for a household in the township was $47,772, and the median income for a family was $59,866. Males had a median income of $41,607 versus $27,917 for females. The per capita income for the township was $24,463. About 6% of families and 7.4% of the population were below the poverty line, including 15.4% of those under age 18 and 4.2% of those age 65 or over.
