= William W. Foster =

American politician (1922-2000)

Member of the Pennsylvania House of Representatives from the 139th district
- In office 1971–1984
- Preceded by: J. Russell Eshback
- Succeeded by: Jerry Birmelin

Personal details
- Born: July 22, 1922 Cherry Ridge Township, Wayne County, Pennsylvania
- Died: January 25, 2000 (aged 77) Honesdale, Pennsylvania
- Party: Republican

William Walter Foster (July 22, 1922 – January 25, 2000) was a former Republican member of the Pennsylvania House of Representatives.
