= Joseph Adams (Pennsylvania politician) =

American politician (born 1962/63)

Member of the Pennsylvania House of Representatives from the 139th district
- In office January 3, 2023 – February 9, 2024
- Preceded by: Michael Peifer
- Succeeded by: Jeff Olsommer

Personal details
- Born: 1962/63
- Party: Republican
- Spouse: Kathryn Scott Adams
- Education: University of Scranton B.S., MBA; Pace University CFP
- Occupation: Banker

Joseph Adams is an American politician who served as a member of the Pennsylvania House of Representatives for the 139th district. Elected in November 2022, he assumed office on January 3, 2023. he resigned his seat early on February 9, 2024.

== Early life ==
Adams graduated from the Wallenpaupack Area High-School in 1980. He attended the University of Pennsylvania from 1980 to 1981 before transferring to the University of Scranton, graduating magna cum laude as part of their class of 1985 with a Bachelor of Science in Economics/Finance. He attended the University of Scranton to earn a Master of Business Administration in 1996 with honors. He then earned his Certified Financial Planner certification in 2002 from Pace University.

He worked as a banker for Morgan Stanley from 2002 to 2006, and then worked for The Dime Bank in Honesdale, Pennsylvania, for 13 years from 2006 to 2019.

== Political career ==
Adams served as the Wayne County commissioner having been elected in 2017. He served on numerous boards and became the vice chairman of the Wayne County Board of Commissioners.

Incumbent Republican Michael Peifer announced that he would not be seeking re-election in 2022. Adams, a childhood friend and neighbor of Peifer, entered the ring for the Republican candidacy beating out Robert Beierle and Theo Balu with 43.23% of the vote. The next closest was Beierle with 33.18. Adams would go on to defeat Democrat Meghan Rosenfeld with an almost 25% margin of victory.

Due to the razor-thin margin that exists in the Pennsylvania House at the time of his election, Adams has called out for bipartisanship and cooperation to govern the state regardless of political affiliation for the good of their constituents. He has also reflected on the fact he succeeded his close personal friend and hoped to keep his political views as close as possible to Peifer's. He supports improving infrastructure, reducing taxes, and bringing more industrial jobs into Wayne County. He opened his district office in Hawley.

He announced on January 23, 2024 that he would not seek re-election in 2024, but that he intended to serve for the remainder of his term. However, he resigned on February 9, 2024, citing family medical news.

== Personal life ==
Adam's family have lived in Wayne County for 5 generations. He is married to Kathryn Scott Adams and the couple lives in Salem Township.

== Electoral history ==
PA House election, 2022 Republican Primary: Pennsylvania House, District 139
Party	Candidate	Votes	%
Republican	Joseph Adams	3,921	43.23%
Republican	Robert Beierle	3,009	33.18%
Republican	Theo Balu	2,129	23.47%
Margin of victory		912	10.08%
Turnout		9,059	100%

PA House election, 2022: Pennsylvania House, District 139
Party	Candidate	Votes	%
Republican	Joseph Adams	16,675	62.2%
Democratic	Meghan Rosenfeld	9,871	36.8%
Margin of victory		6,804	25.4%
Turnout		26,546	100%
