= Cherry Ridge Township, Wayne County, Pennsylvania =

Township in Pennsylvania, United States

Cherry Ridge, Pennsylvania
- Second-class township
- Township of Cherry Ridge
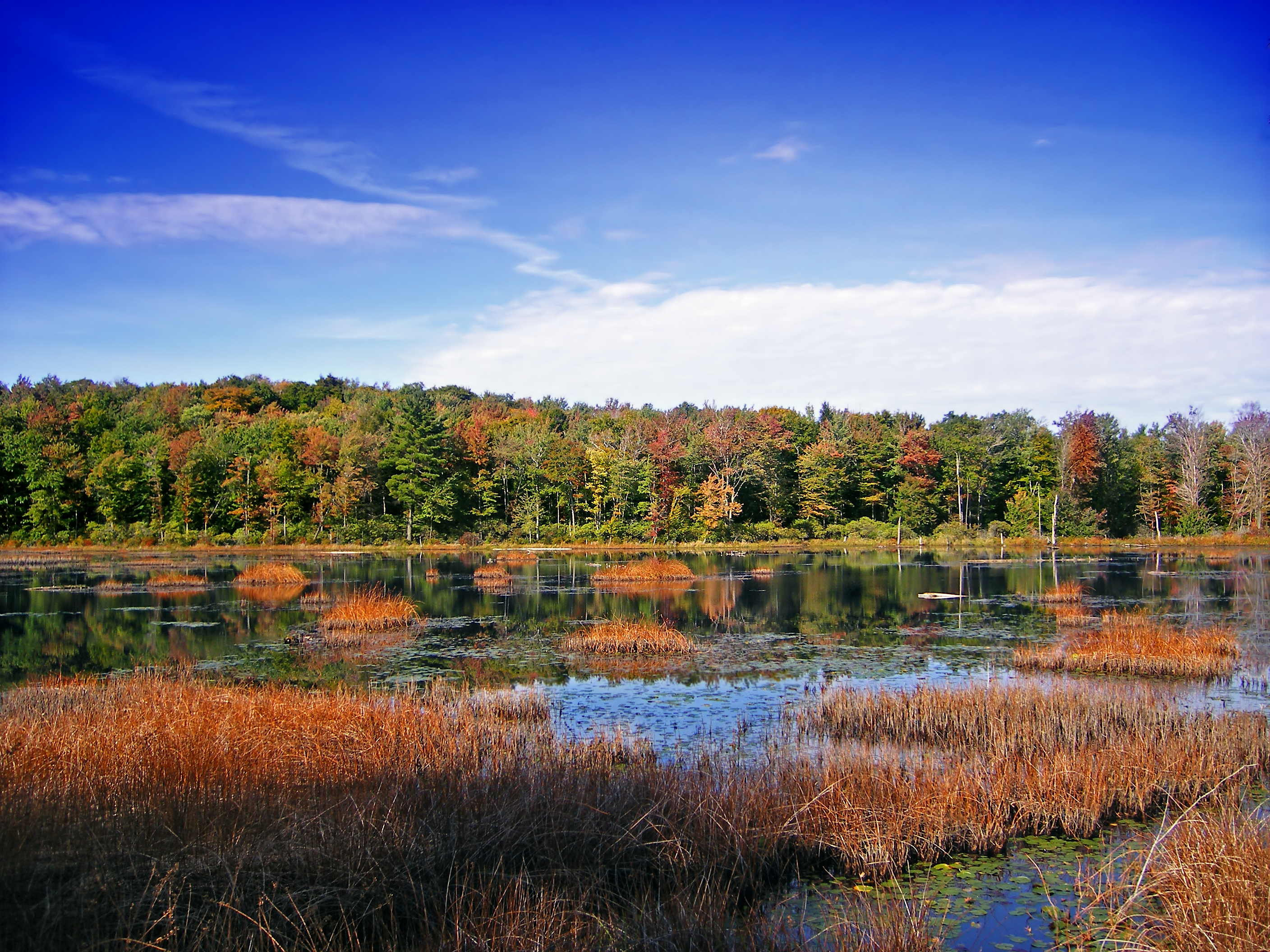
- A wetland in Hoadleys.

- Location in Wayne County and the state of Pennsylvania.
- Country: United States
- State: Pennsylvania
- U.S. congressional district: PA-8
- State senatorial district: 20
- State House of Representatives district: 139
- County: Wayne
- School district: Wayne Highlands; Region III
- Settled: Before 1798
- Incorporated: April 30, 1844
- Founder: Enos Woodward, Col. John H. Schenck
- Named for: Cherry tree

Government
  - Type: Board of Supervisors
  - Board of Supervisors: Supervisors: Peter J. Suhosky II; Mark Lienert; John Rickard, Jr.
  - US Representative: Matt Cartwright (D)
  - State Senator: Rosemary Brown (R)
  - State Representative: Jeffrey Olsommer (R)

Area
  - Total: 22.26 sq mi (57.65 km^{2})
  - Land: 21.42 sq mi (55.49 km^{2})
  - Water: 0.83 sq mi (2.16 km^{2})
- Elevation: 1,401 ft (427 m)

Population (2020)
  - Total: 1,913
  - Density: 89.3/sq mi (34.48/km^{2})
- Time zone: UTC-5 (Eastern (EST))
  - Summer (DST): UTC-4 (Eastern Daylight (EDT))
- Area code: 570
- GNIS feature ID: 1217215
- FIPS code: 42-127-13096
- Website: Cherry Ridge Township

Cherry Ridge (Note: officially the Township of Cherry Ridge, or just Cherry Ridge Township) is a second-class township in Wayne County, Pennsylvania, United States. The township's population was 1,913 at the time of the 2020 United States Census.

== Geography ==
According to the United States Census Bureau, the township has a total area of 22.3 square miles (58 km^{2}), of which 21.4 square miles (55 km^{2}) is land and 0.8 square miles (2.1 km^{2}) (3.75%) is water.

== Communities ==
The following villages are located in Cherry Ridge Township:

- Cherry Ridge
- Clemo
- Hoadleys

== Demographics ==
Historical population
Census	Pop.	Note	%±
2010	1,895		—
2020	1,913		0.9%
U.S. Decennial Census

As of the census of 2010, there were 1,895 people, 773 households, and 538 families residing in the township. The population density was 88.5 inhabitants per square mile (34.2/km^{2}). There were 903 housing units at an average density of 42.2 per square mile (16.3/km^{2}). The racial makeup of the township was 98.6% White, 0.1% African American, 0.05% Native American, 0.1% Asian, 0.1% from other races, and 1.05% from two or more races. Hispanic or Latino of any race were 2% of the population.

There were 773 households, out of which 25.9% had children under the age of 18 living with them, 58.7% were married couples living together, 7.8% had a female householder with no husband present, and 30.4% were non-families. 23.5% of all households were made up of individuals, and 11.2% had someone living alone who was 65 years of age or older. The average household size was 2.45 and the average family size was 2.94.

In the township the population was spread out, with 21.4% under the age of 18, 60.2% from 18 to 64, and 18.4% who were 65 years of age or older. The median age was 44.7 years.

The median income for a household in the township was $49,375, and the median income for a family was $52,500. Males had a median income of $34,348 versus $31,875 for females. The per capita income for the township was $24,824. About 4% of families and 6% of the population were below the poverty line, including 9.5% of those under age 18 and 7.5% of those age 65 or over.
