= Damascus Historic District =

Historic district in Pennsylvania, United States

- U.S. National Register of Historic Places
- U.S. Historic district
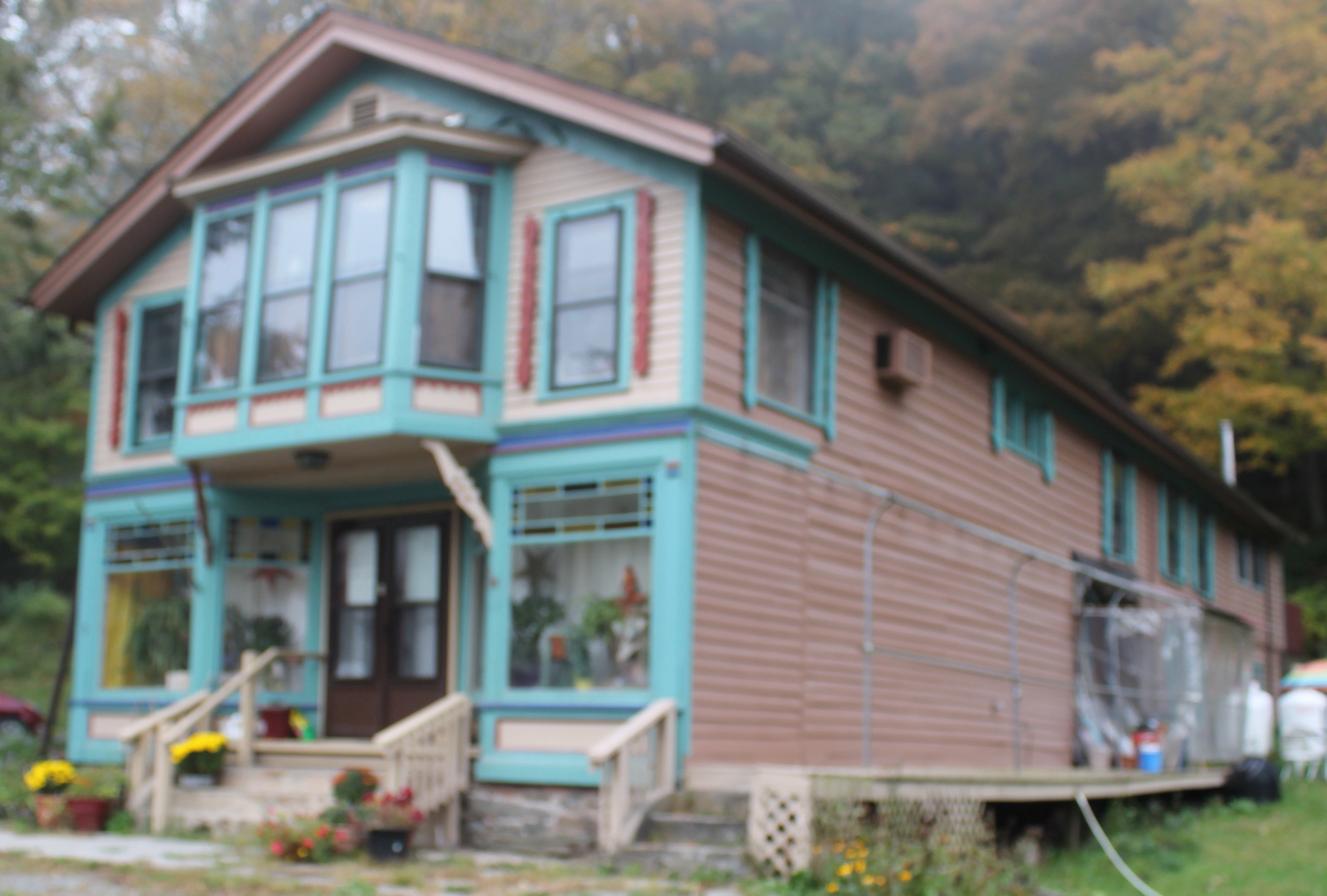
- Damascus Hist Dist, PA

- Location within Pennsylvania Location within the United States
- Location: Roughly, PA 371 from Galilee Rd. to the Delaware R. and adjacent part of Rt. 63027 S of PA 371, Damascus Township, Pennsylvania
- Coordinates: 41°42′37″N 75°04′15″W
- Area: 45 acres (18 ha)
- Built: 1810
- Architectural style: Renaissance, Greek Revival, Queen Anne
- MPS: Upper Delaware Valley, New York and Pennsylvania MPS
- NRHP reference No.: 92001000
- Added to NRHP: August 14, 1992

Damascus Historic District, is a national historic district located within Damascus Village in Damascus Township, Wayne County, Pennsylvania. The district includes 36 contributing buildings, 2 contributing sites, and 2 contributing structures in the community of Damascus. The buildings are in a variety of popular architectural styles including Greek Revival, Queen Anne, and Renaissance Revival. Notable buildings include the Baptist Church (c. 1832), Damascus Academy, Vail and Appley Store (c. 1860), Methodist Church (1857), Philip O'Reilly House (c. 1840), and Luther Appley House (c. 1850). The sites are the Hillside Cemetery and Overlook Cemetery.

It was added to the National Register of Historic Places in 1992 by Dr. Brent D. Glass.

== National Register of Historic Places Building Inventory ==
- Philip O'Reilly House
- Takace's Cottages
- Vail & Appley Store
- Sheard House
- Meckle's House
- Stephenson House
- White's House
- Olver House
- Abraham's House
- Tyler House
- Priebe's House
- Dr. Tyler House
- Dentist Office
- Damascus School
- Damascus Methodist
- Hillside Cemetery
- Tegeler House
- Berry House
- Gries House
- Burcher House
- Theobald House
- Tobias Pethick House
- Early House
- John Pethick
- Bush House
- Graby's House
- Damascus Baptist Church
- Overlook Cemetery
- Don Bush House
- Turner House
- Otto Appley House
- Luther Appley House
- Drake House
