= Norman Welton =

American journalist (1928–2009)

Norman Welton (1928 – July 1, 2009) was an American journalist. Welton worked for the Associated Press for 44 years. He was the photo editor for 31 years.

Welton joined the Associated Press in 1946 as a part-time messenger and worked his way up until he reached senior photo editor in 1961. During his time he covered four Olympic Games and several events at the United Nations. He retired in 1992.

Welton died of colon cancer in Hawley, Pennsylvania.
