= J.S. O'Connor American Rich Cut Glassware Factory =

- U.S. National Register of Historic Places
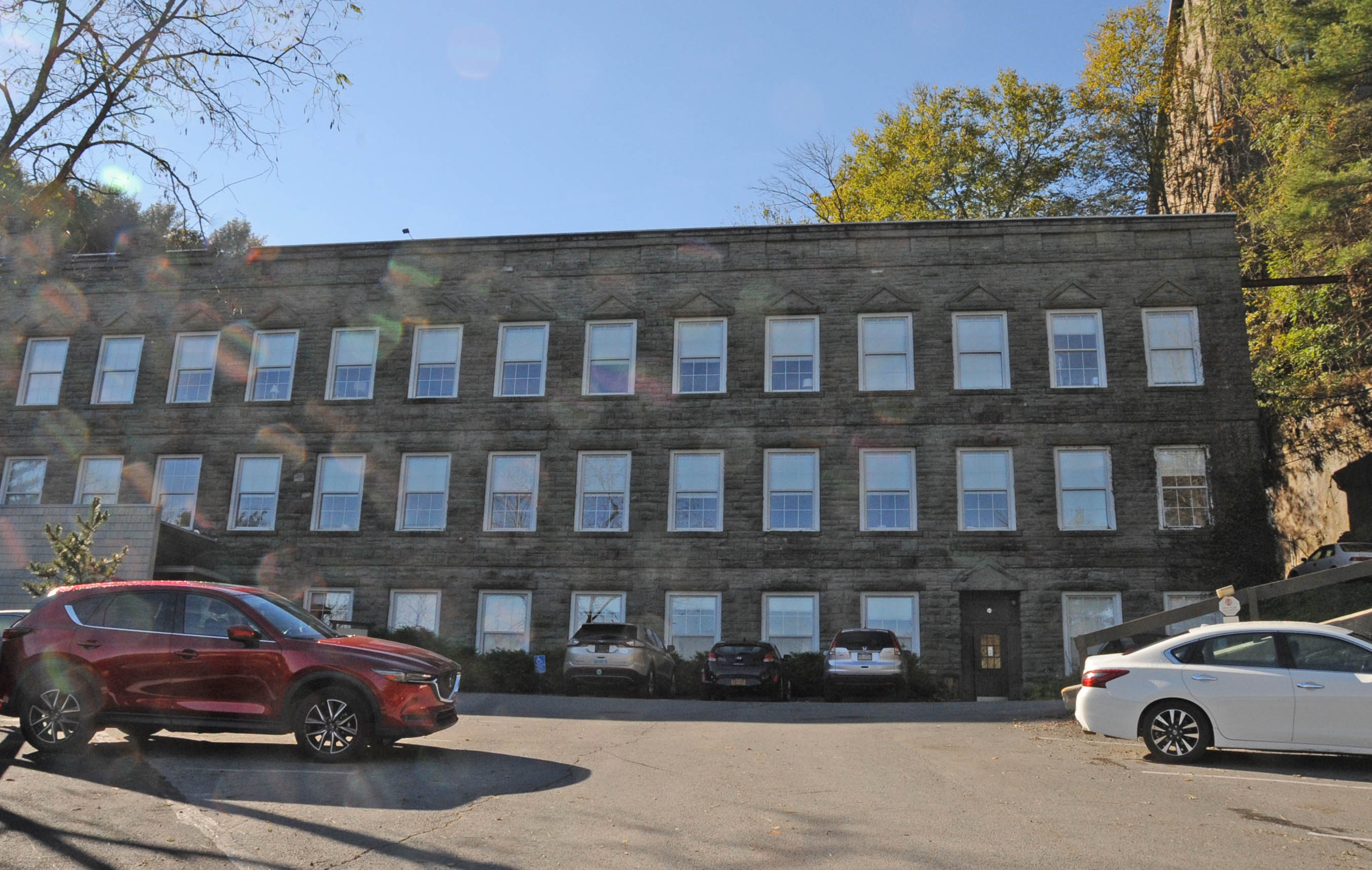

- Location within Pennsylvania Location within the United States
- Location: 120 Falls Ave., Hawley, Pennsylvania
- Coordinates: 41°28′31″N 75°10′17″W
- Area: less than one acre
- Architectural style: Federal
- NRHP reference No.: 05000206
- Added to NRHP: March 23, 2005

The J.S. O'Connor American Rich Cut Glassware Factory, also known as the Maple City Glass Company, H.W. Kimble Silk Company, and Arrow Throwing Company, is an historic glassware factory and silk mill located in Hawley, Wayne County, Pennsylvania.

This building was added to the National Register of Historic Places in 2004.

== History and architectural features ==
With the waning of the canal and gravity rail operations during the late nineteenth century, Hawley developed into a busy manufacturing town. In addition to silk fabric and garments, among the chief products was fine cut glass, then a fashionable consumer good. The leading cut glass establishment was that of John Sarsfield O’Connor (1831 - 1916) at the base of the Paupack Falls.

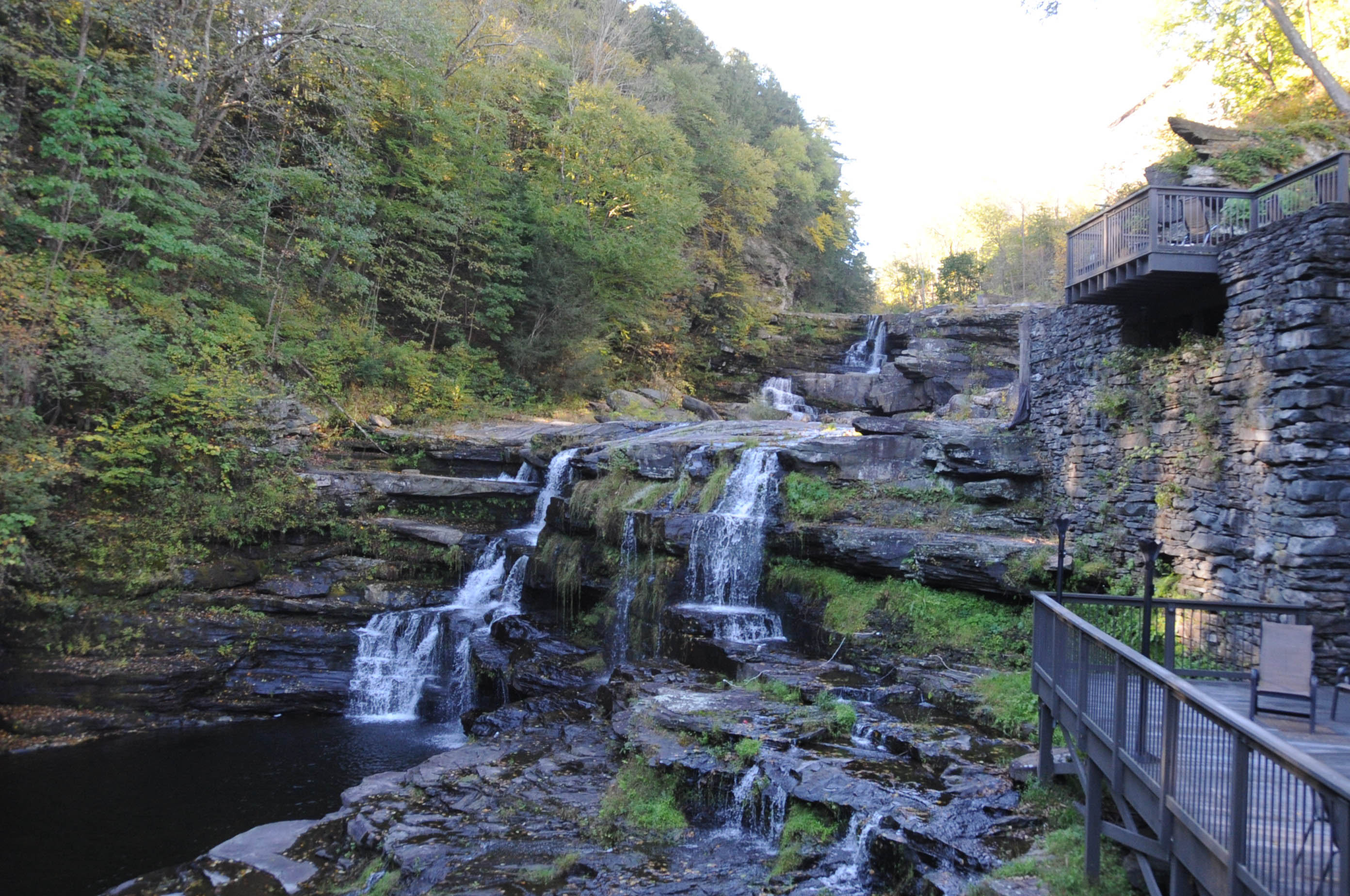
Waterfall

This building was built on the site of previous mills of wood-frame construction in 1890. The earliest of these dates back to the founding of the hamlet of Paupack Eddy, the forerunner of Hawley, in the closing decade of the eighteenth century. It is a three-story, one hundred and sixty-foot long and forty-four-foot wide, bluestone building which was designed in the Federal style, with an addition that was forty by seventy-five feet.

J.S. O’Connor Rich Cut Glass has been described as one of the most extensive glass cutting factories in America with O’Connor recalled as one of the finest glass cutters in the nation. The factory was said to be one of a kind in America, run by waterpower and lit by electricity generated by its own electrical plant. The firm had a capacity of two hundred and fifty cutting frames.

John S. O'Connor erected this bluestone building for the purpose of manufacturing cut glass using Dorflinger blanks. The electricity used was generated from the Wallenpaupack Falls located directly behind the building. A three hundred-candle-powered dynamo was housed in the basement. The office, roughing and stockrooms were on the first floor; the second and third floors held the designing, smoothing and polishing departments. The factory was a well-orchestrated assembly-line operation.

The "Brilliant Period" in glass cutting occurred between 1880 and 1905. O'Connor designed many highly collectible patterns, such as Parisian, Florentine, and Princess, and also designed special cutting wheels for circular cuts, a vacuum device that prevented glasscutters from inhaling the ground glass, and a hardwood polisher. When the third floor was rebuilt, fifty cutting frames were added. This increased the workforce from one hundred and fifty to nearly two hundred; as a result, a new showroom was built.

In 1900, O'Connor opened a second factory in Goshen, New York, and on January 16, 1902, O’Connor sold his Hawley plant, relocating from Hawley, Pennsylvania, to Goshen, New York.

The factory was later converted into a boutique hotel known as the "Country Inn" during the 1980s, although today the facility operates as the "Ledges Hotel." Ledges Hotel was also inducted into Historic Hotels of America, the official program of the National Trust for Historic Preservation, in 2013.

== O'Connor's personal life ==
O'Connor was born in Ireland in 1831 and came to America as a child. In his youth, he was an apprentice in cut-glass factories in New York City. After serving in the Civil War, he was employed by Christian Dorflinger at White Mills. He received first prize for his cut-glass submission to the Paris Exposition.

He died at his Hawley home, located next to his built factory, in 1916 at the age of eighty-five, and was buried in a Honesdale, Pennsylvania cemetery with his family.
