= J. Russell Eshback =

American politician (1898-1981)

Member of the Pennsylvania House of Representatives from the 139th district
- In office 1969–1970
- Preceded by: District created
- Succeeded by: William W. Foster

Member of the Pennsylvania House of Representatives from the Pike County district
- In office 1959–1968

Personal details
- Born: April 28, 1898 Bushkill, Pennsylvania
- Died: August 24, 1981 (aged 83) Bushkill, Pennsylvania
- Party: Republican

J. Russell Eshback (April 28, 1898 – August 24, 1981) was a Republican member of the Pennsylvania House of Representatives.
