= Dreher (surname) =

Dreher (German for "turner") is a German surname. Notable people with the surname include:

- Anton Dreher (1810–1863), Austrian brewer
- Aristotle Dreher (born 1978), American musician
- Axel Dreher (born 1972), German economist
- Bernd Dreher (born 1966), German footballer
- Carl Dreher (1896–1976), American electrical engineer
- Christoph Dreher (born 1952), German filmmaker
- Claudia Dreher (born 1971), German long-distance runner
- Ferd Dreher (1913–1996), American football player
- Joseph Dreher (1884–1941), French athlete
- Lachlan Dreher (born 1967), Australian field hockey player
- Lance Dreher (born 1955), American bodybuilder
- Mark Dreher (born 1961), Australian rules footballer
- Michael Dreher (disambiguation), multiple people
- Peter Dreher (1932–2020), German artist
- Rod Dreher (born 1967), American writer
- Sarah Dreher (1937–2012), American writer
- Uwe Dreher (1960–2016), German footballer
- Wilhelm Dreher (1892–1969), German politician

== See also ==
- Jacob Wingard Dreher House, historic home in Lexington County, South Carolina
