= Middle Creek (Lackawaxen River tributary) =

River in Pennsylvania, United States

Coordinates: 41°28′42″N 75°10′56″W

Middle Creek is a 20.7-mile-long (33.3 km) tributary of the Lackawaxen River in the Poconos of eastern Pennsylvania.

The confluence of Middle Creek and the Lackawaxen River at Hawley is located behind the Hawley Public Library.

History of the name: The name Middle Creek is a shortened version of Middle Valley Creek, as the creek's headwaters originate in Middle Valley with the upper end being Varden.

== See also ==
- List of rivers of Pennsylvania
