= Jerry Birmelin =

American politician (born 1949)

Member of the Pennsylvania House of Representatives from the 139th district
- In office January 1, 1985 – November 30, 2006
- Preceded by: William W. Foster
- Succeeded by: Michael Peifer

Personal details
- Born: Jerald M. Birmelin; April 18, 1949 (age 77) New York, New York, U.S.
- Party: Republican
- Spouse: Elaine Birmelin

Jerald M. "Jerry" Birmelin (born April 18, 1949) is an American politician who formerly served as a Republican member of the Pennsylvania House of Representatives.

He is a 1967 graduate of Lake Ariel High School. He earned a degree in education from University of Scranton in 1973.

He was first elected to represent the 139th legislative district in the Pennsylvania House of Representatives in 1984. During his career, Birmelin was known for his Pro-life stand on abortion and for his opposition to Same-sex marriage. He retired prior to the 2006 elections.

Birmelin voted in favor of the controversial legislative pay raise, passed in the middle of the night without debate or public comment, inspiring several candidates to challenge him in the 2006 election. Several of these candidates were affiliated with PACleanSweep, a statewide effort to defeat any legislators voting for the pay raise. On January 26, 2006, Birmelin joined 26 of his colleagues and announced that he would not seek re-election. Pike County treasurer, Michael Peifer went on to win the Republican nomination and won the election.

Following retirement from the House, Birmelin began his own political consulting firm, Birmelin Consulting, and assisted Chris Hackett in his 2008 campaign for Pennsylvania's 10th congressional district against Chris Carney.

A decade after leaving the House, Birmelin ran in 2016 as a Republican candidate for District 111 of the Pennsylvania House of Representatives. Birmelin was defeated in the 2016 Republican Primary Election by Jonathan Fritz.
