= Michael Peifer =

American politician (born 1968)

Michael T. Peifer

Member of the Pennsylvania House of Representatives from the 139th district
- In office January 2, 2007 – January 3, 2023
- Preceded by: Jerry Birmelin
- Succeeded by: Joseph Adams
- Majority: Chairman of the House Finance Committee

Personal details
- Born: 1968 (age 57–58) Scranton, Pennsylvania, U.S.
- Party: Republican
- Spouse: Jen Peifer
- Children: 3 children
- Education: Rider College
- Occupation: Certified Public Accountant
- Committees: House Finance Committee House Transportation Committee
- Website: http://reppeifer.com

Michael T. "Mike" Peifer (born 1968) is a Republican former member of the Pennsylvania House of Representatives, representing the 139th legislative district from 2006 to 2023.

== Biography ==
Prior to elective office, Peifer attended Wallenpaupack Area High School. He attended Rider College on a baseball scholarship and earned a degree in accounting. Peifer worked for Price Waterhouse LLP, eventually rising to the level of a senior tax consultant as a Certified Public Accountant. In 1995, Peifer opened his own accounting and tax firm in his hometown of Greentown, Pennsylvania. Peifer served as Pike County treasurer from 1999 through 2006.

As a state representative, served on the board of the Pennsylvania Higher Education Assistance Agency from 2011 through 2022, including as the board's chair in 2017-2020 and 2022. Peifer also served as a deputy whip for the House Republican Caucus during the 2015-16 session.

Peifer did not seek reelection to the Pennsylvania State House in 2022. After leaving office, Peifer joined Novak Strategic Advisors as a Senior Advisor in February 2023.
