= Patriotic Order Sons of America Washington Camp 422 =

- U.S. National Register of Historic Places
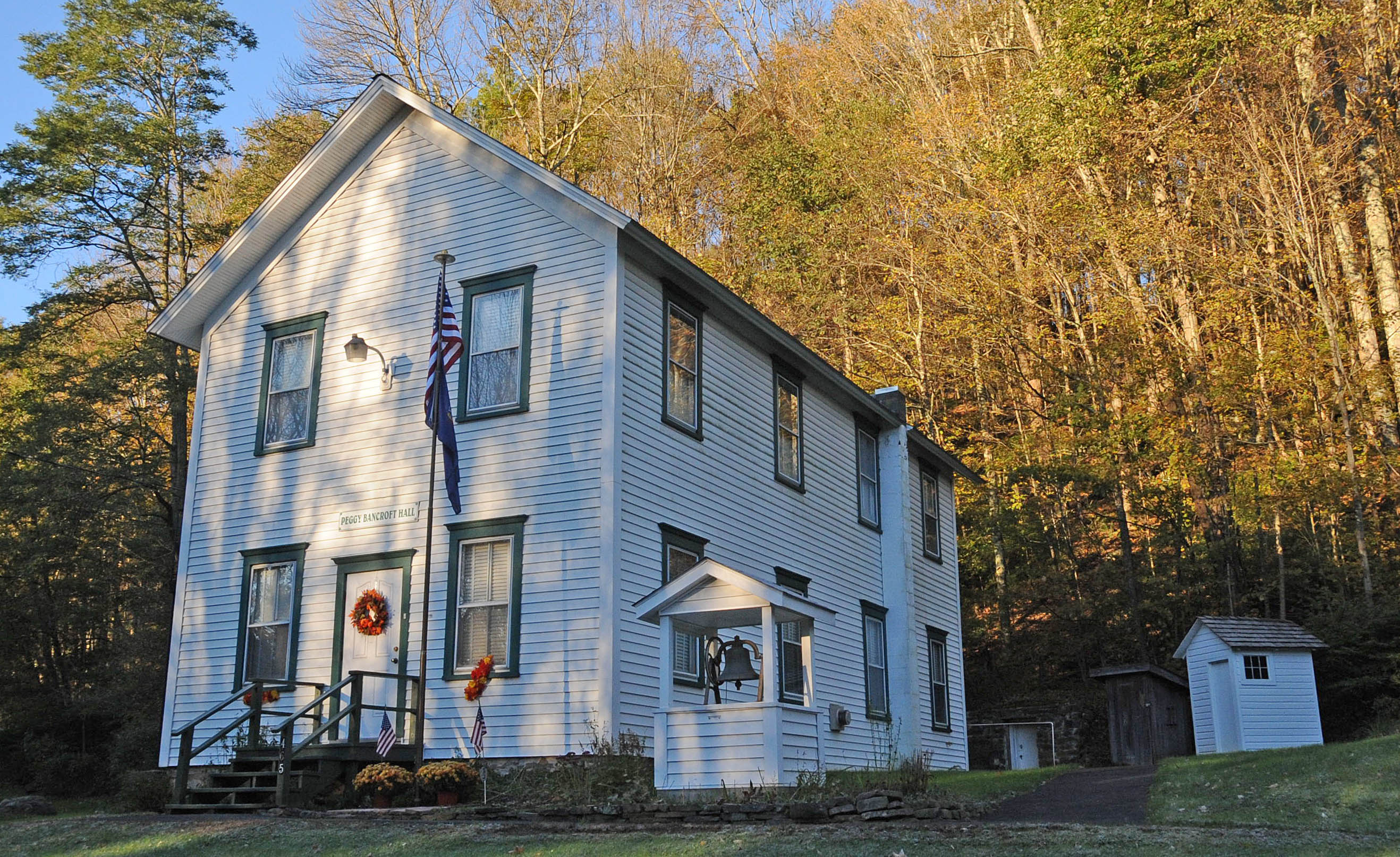

- Location within Pennsylvania Location within the United States
- Location: 465 South Sterling Road, Dreher Township, Pennsylvania
- Coordinates: 41°16′28″N 75°20′11″W
- Area: less than one acre
- Built: 1934
- NRHP reference No.: 10001068
- Added to NRHP: December 27, 2010

The Patriotic Order Sons of America Washington Camp 422, also known as the Women's Society of Christian Service Hall, is an historic building in Dreher Township, Wayne County, Pennsylvania, United States.

It was listed on the National Register of Historic Places in 2010.

== History and architectural features ==
Built in 1904, as a meeting hall for the local chapter of the Patriotic Order Sons of America, this historic structure is a two-story, rectangular, wood-frame building that measures approximately twenty-two feet wide and forty-four feet deep. A one-story addition was built in 1999. The building houses the Greene-Dreher Historical Society's artifact collection.
