= Hill's Sawmill =

- U.S. National Register of Historic Places
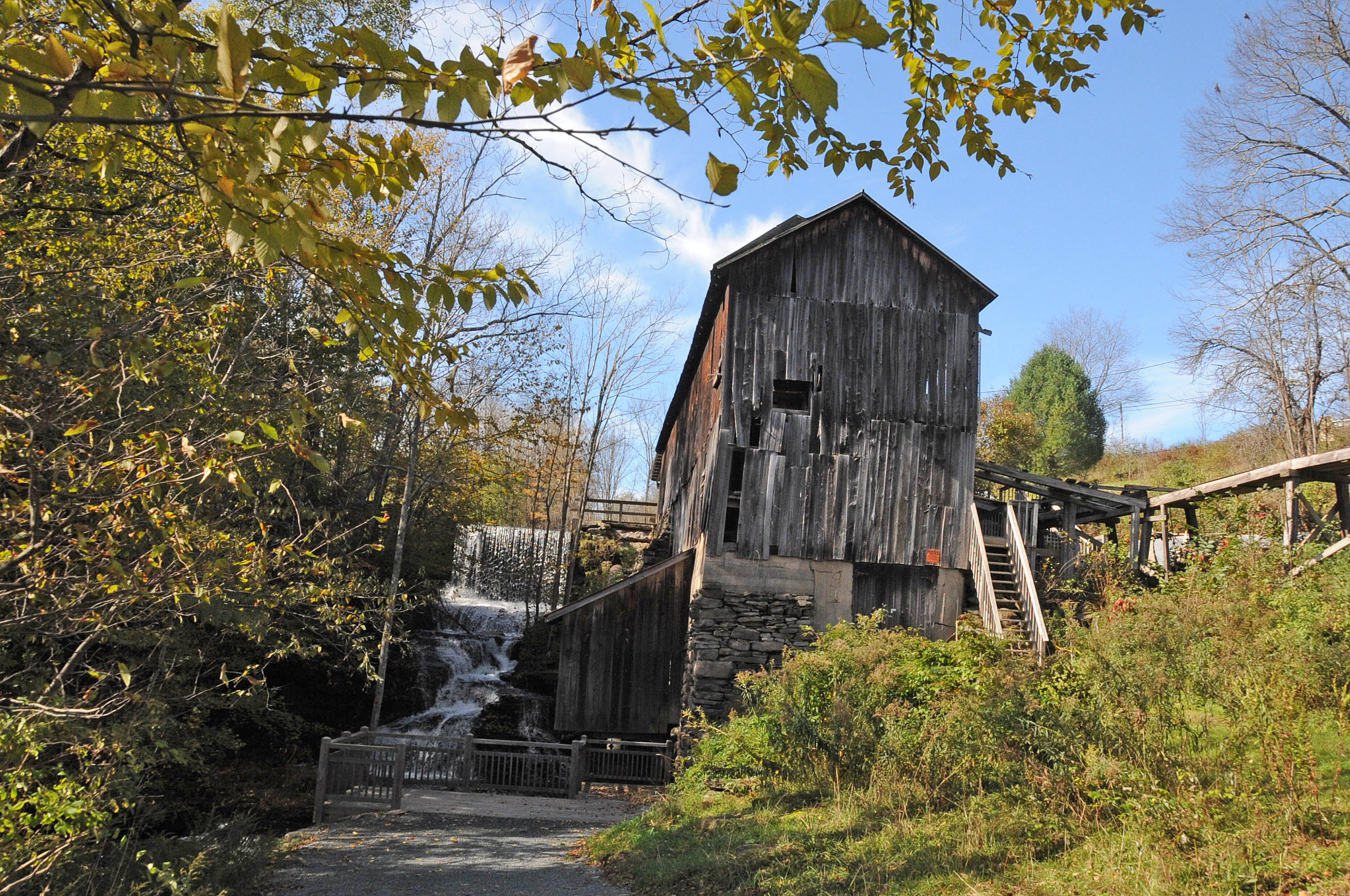
- View from below the mill

- Location within Pennsylvania Location within the United States
- Location: South of Equinunk off Pennsylvania Route 191, Damascus Township, Pennsylvania
- Coordinates: 41°45′9″N 75°11′36″W
- Area: 4 acres (1.6 ha)
- Built: 1873
- Built by: Holbert, William; Branning, John D.
- NRHP reference No.: 74001816
- Added to NRHP: November 8, 1974

Hill's Sawmill, also known as the Holbert & Branning Mill and Duck Harbor Lumber & Chemical Co., is an historic sawmill which is located in Damascus Township, Wayne County, Pennsylvania.

It was added to the National Register of Historic Places in 1974.

== History and architectural features ==
Built in 1873, Hill's Sawmill is a two-story, rectangular building with a gable roof, which is seventy feet long and twenty-five feet wide and sits on a stone foundation. It contains original mill equipment.

== Gallery ==
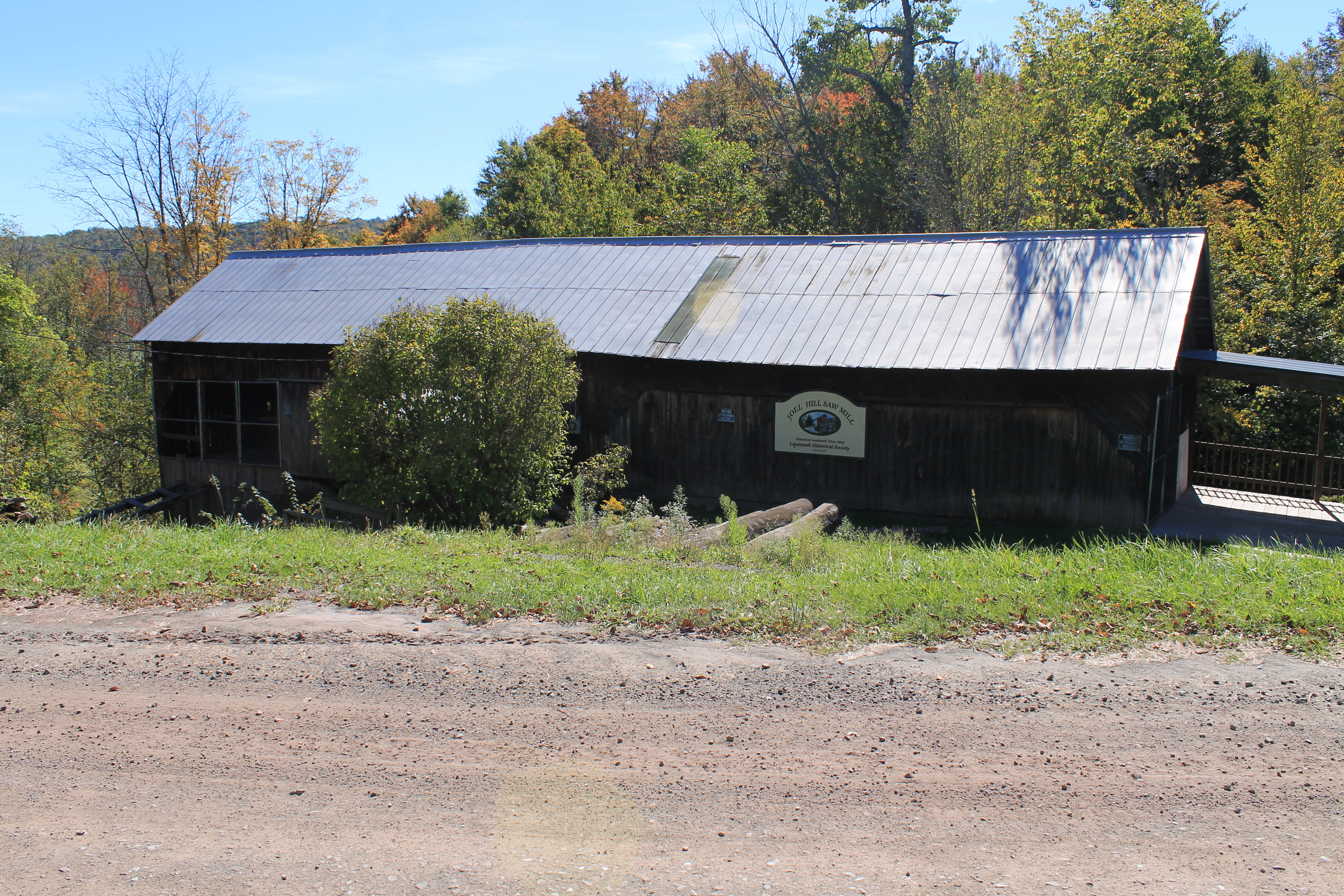
Hill's Sawmill
