= Texas Township, Pennsylvania =

Township in Pennsylvania, US

Texas Township
- Township
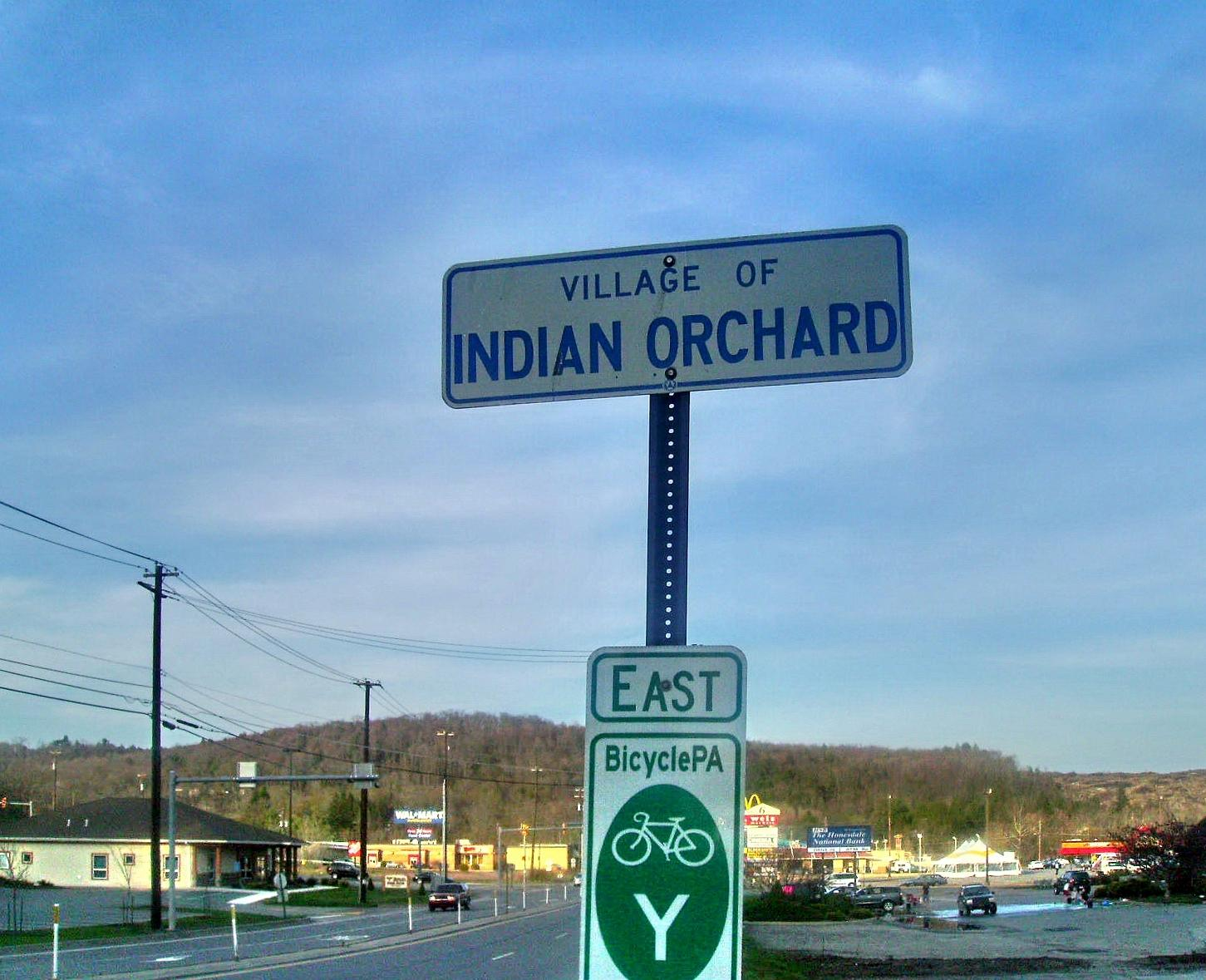
- Signage on U.S. Route 6 eastbound entering the village of Indian Orchard.

- Location in Wayne County and the state of Pennsylvania.

- Location of Pennsylvania in the United States
- Coordinates: 41°32′30″N 75°13′59″W
- Country: United States
- State: Pennsylvania
- County: Wayne

Area
  - Total: 14.40 sq mi (37.29 km^{2})
  - Land: 14.03 sq mi (36.35 km^{2})
  - Water: 0.36 sq mi (0.94 km^{2})
- Elevation: 1,207 ft (368 m)

Population (2010)
  - Total: 2,569
  - Estimate (2016): 2,433
  - Density: 173.3/sq mi (66.93/km^{2})
- Time zone: UTC-5 (EST)
  - Summer (DST): UTC-4 (EDT)
- Area code: 570
- FIPS code: 42-127-76424

Texas is a second-class township in Wayne County, Pennsylvania, United States. The township's population was 2,422 at the time of the 2018 United States Census.

== History ==
The Eugene Dorflinger Estate was added to the National Register of Historic Places in 1978.

== Geography ==
According to the United States Census Bureau, the township has a total area of 14.5 square miles (38 km^{2}), of which 14.4 square miles (37 km^{2}) is land and 0.1 square miles (0.26 km^{2}), or 0.69%, is water. It contains the census-designated place of White Mills.

== Demographics ==
Historical population
Census	Pop.	Note	%±
2010	2,569		—
2016 (est.)	2,433		−5.3%
U.S. Decennial Census

As of the census of 2000, there were 2,501 people, 943 households, and 657 families residing in the township. The population density was 173.5 inhabitants per square mile (67.0/km^{2}). There were 1,062 housing units at an average density of 73.7 per square mile (28.5/km^{2}). The racial makeup of the township was 97.60% White, 0.56% African American, 0.48% Native American, 0.60% Asian, 0.20% from other races, and 0.56% from two or more races. Hispanic or Latino of any race were 1.12% of the population.

There were 943 households, out of which 31.4% had children under the age of 18 living with them, 51.4% were married couples living together, 12.9% had a female householder with no husband present, and 30.3% were non-families. 26.7% of all households were made up of individuals, and 11.8% had someone living alone who was 65 years of age or older. The average household size was 2.47 and the average family size was 2.97.

In the township the population was spread out, with 24.0% under the age of 18, 5.5% from 18 to 24, 24.8% from 25 to 44, 24.6% from 45 to 64, and 21.1% who were 65 years of age or older. The median age was 42 years. For every 100 females, there were 86.8 males. For every 100 females age 18 and over, there were 81.4 males.

The median income for a household in the township was $31,389, and the median income for a family was $37,500. Males had a median income of $31,217 versus $19,208 for females. The per capita income for the township was $14,429. About 9.7% of families and 13.0% of the population were below the poverty line, including 19.2% of those under age 18 and 6.0% of those age 65 or over.

== Education ==
Most of the township is in Wayne Highlands School District, while a portion is in Wallenpaupack Area School District.
