= Damascus, Pennsylvania =

Unincorporated community in Pennsylvania, US

- Village
- Village of Damascus
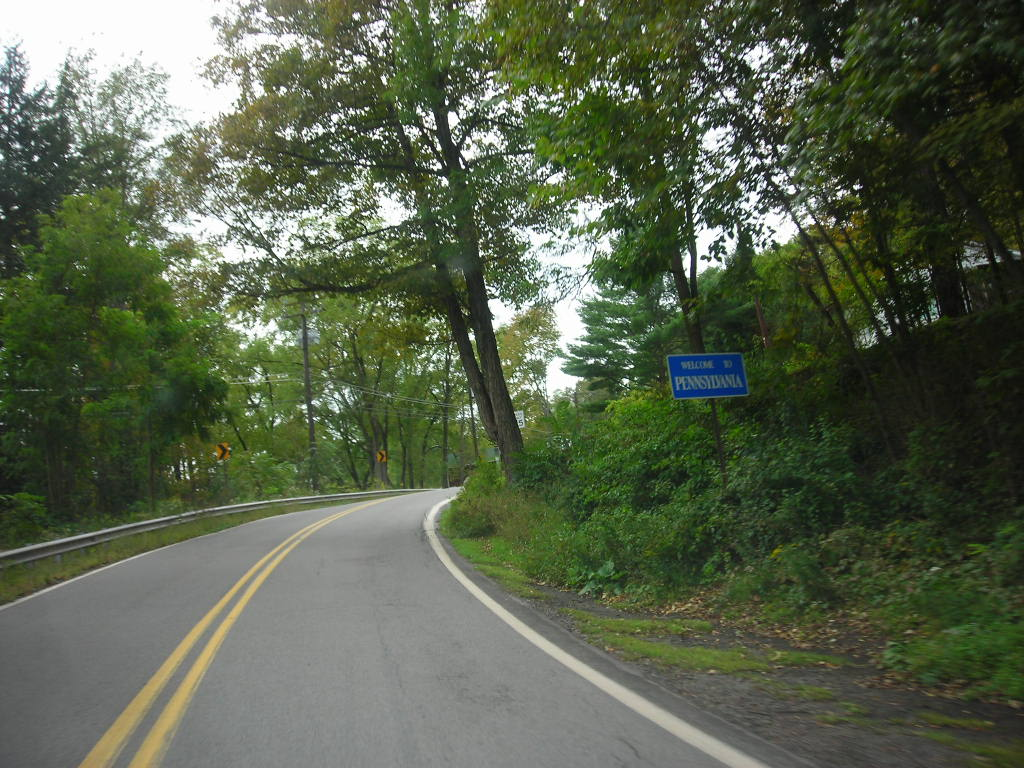
- "Welcome to Pennsylvania" sign on Pennsylvania Route 371 in Damascus.
- Nickname: Shields Mills (historical)
- Location of Damascus within Pennsylvania. Damascus (the United States)
- Coordinates: 41°42′11.3184″N 75°4′5.6064″W
- Country: United States
- State: Pennsylvania
- County: Wayne
- Congressional district: PA-10
- School district: Wayne Highlands; Region I
- Magisterial District: 22-3-04
- Township: Damascus
- Named after: Damascus, Syria
- Elevation: 735 ft (224 m)
- Time zone: UTC-5 (Eastern (EST))
  - Summer (DST): UTC-4 (Eastern Daylight (EDT))
- ZIP code: 18415
- Area codes: 570 and 272
- GNIS feature ID: 1172912
- FIPS code: 42-127-18104
- Waterways: Beaverdam Creek, Delaware River

Damascus is a village in Damascus Township, Wayne County, Pennsylvania, United States. The Damascus-Cochecton Bridge connects the town with Cochecton, New York across the Delaware River. The bridge is often used by smugglers of fireworks (which are legal in Pennsylvania but illegal in New York), especially in the run-up to the Independence Day holiday, when fireworks are used extensively.

== History ==
The Damascus Post Office has been in operation since January 24, 1824.
