= Michael Dreher =

Michael Dreher may refer to:

- Michael Dreher (director) (born 1974), German film director and screenwriter
- Michael E. Dreher (born 1944), Swiss politician
