= Christian Dorflinger =

American glass manufacturer

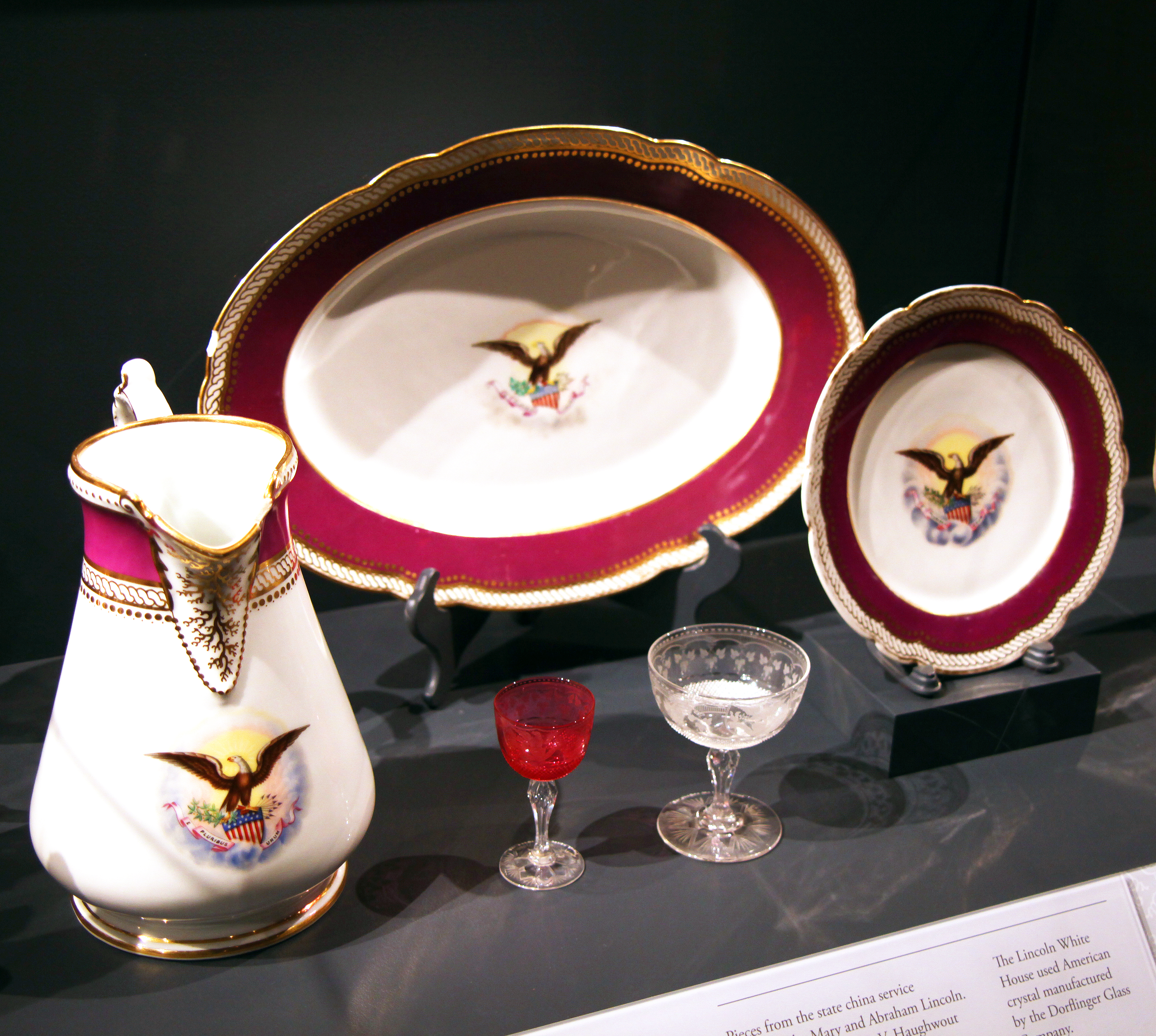
Glasses by Dorflinger for the Lincoln dinner service in the White House

Christian Dorflinger (1828–1915) was an American glass manufacturer.

== Biography ==
He was born in Rosteig, a small village in the Alsace region of Northern France on the German border. When his father died he was apprenticed to a glass manufacturer in Lorraine, but he accompanied his mother when she decided to emigrate to the United States. Together with his brother Edward he went to work for a glass factory in Camden, NJ. He began his own factory in Brooklyn, NY in 1852. The next year he opened the Long Island Flint Glass Works, and in 1860 he opened the Greenpoint Glass Works.

He built his largest factory in White Mills, Pennsylvania, where he later died.
