= Bellemonte Silk Mill =

- U.S. National Register of Historic Places
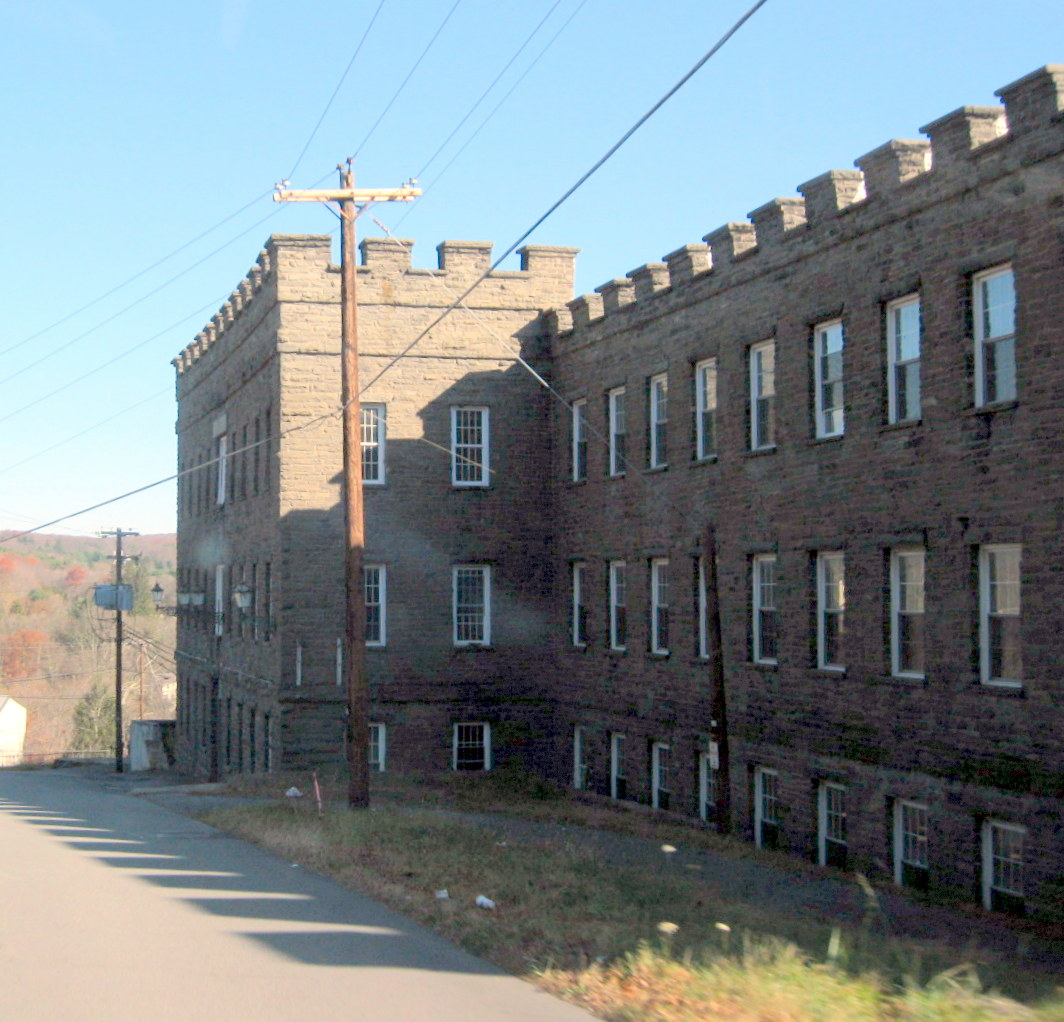
- Bellemonte Silk Mill, November 2009

- Location within Pennsylvania Location within the United States
- Location: 230 Welwood Ave., Hawley, Pennsylvania
- Coordinates: 41°28′19″N 75°10′20″W
- Area: 3 acres (1.2 ha)
- Built: 1880-1881, 1894
- Architectural style: High Victorian Gothic
- NRHP reference No.: 10000407
- Added to NRHP: June 28, 2010

Bellemonte Silk Mill, also known as Welwood Silk Mill and Sherman Underwear Mills, is a historic mill located at Hawley, Wayne County, Pennsylvania. It was built in 1880-1881, and rebuilt in 1894 after a fire. It is a three- to five-story, long and narrow bluestone building in a High Victorian Gothic style. It features a castellated roof parapet. It has a one-story, shed roofed engine house addition. The mill is locally considered to be the largest bluestone building in the world. The property also includes the contributing Cocoon House; a one-story, one room stone building. In 2011 the Bellemonte Silk Mill and Cocoon House were renovated by Peter Bohlin. The Bellemonte Silk Mill became the Hawley Silk Mill and the Cocoon House became Cocoon Coffee House. The building once housed an antique resale shop.

It was added to the National Register of Historic Places in 2010.
