= Jeff Olsommer =

American politician

Jeffrey Olsommer
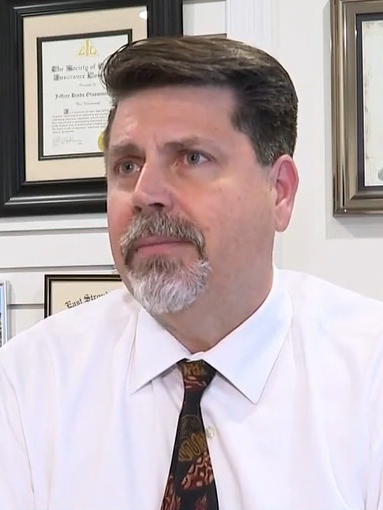
- Olsommer in 2024

Member of the Pennsylvania House of Representatives from the 139th district
- Incumbent
- Assumed office May 21, 2024
- Preceded by: Joe Adams

Personal details
- Party: Republican
- Spouse: Kelli L. Fantauzzo
- Education: East Stroudsburg University (B.S.)
- Alma mater: Western Wayne High School

Jeffrey H. Olsommer is an American businessman and politician who is currently the representative for the 139th District in the Pennsylvania House of Representatives.

== Career ==
After Pennsylvania State Representative Joe Adams announced his retirement, Olsommer announced his candidacy in the 2024 election to replace Adams. On February 9, 2024, Adams resigned before his term concluded, trigging a special election. The Republican Parties of Pike and Wayne Counties chose Olsommer to be the party's nominee in the April 23 special election. He defeated Democratic candidate Robin Skibber in the election. Olsommer was previously the chairman of the Sterling Township Board of Supervisors and co-owned an insurance agency. On the same day as the special election, Olsommer also won the Republican primary election to face Skibber once again in the general election.

== Political positions ==
Olsommer supports "defending the sanctity of human life," but opposes changing Pennsylvania's abortion laws. He supports voter ID; his first action as a state representative was signing a discharge petition that would force a vote on a voter ID amendment to the Pennsylvania Constitution.

== Personal life ==
Olsommer is a lifelong resident of Wayne County, Pennsylvania. He is a graduate of Western Wayne High School and has a bachelor of science degree in political science from East Stroudsburg University. Olsommer lives in Sterling Township with his wife, Kelli L. Fantauzzo.
