= Bridge in Dreher Township =

- U.S. National Register of Historic Places
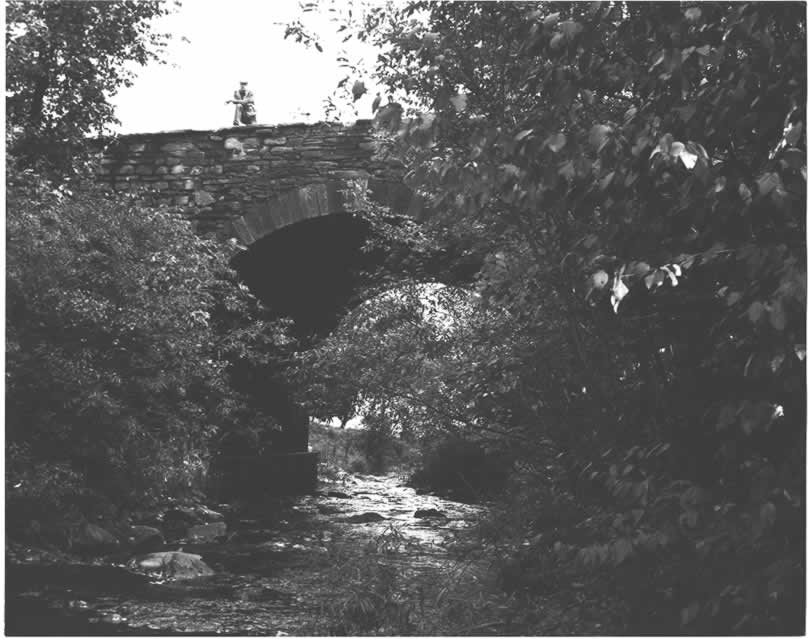
- Bridge in Dreher Township, 1982

- Location within Pennsylvania Location within the United States
- Location: Legislative Route 171 over Haags Mill Creek, Dreher Township, Pennsylvania
- Coordinates: 41°17′17″N 75°19′52″W
- Area: less than one acre
- Built: 1934
- Architectural style: High-rise stone arch
- MPS: Highway Bridges Owned by the Commonwealth of Pennsylvania, Department of Transportation TR
- NRHP reference No.: 88000871
- Added to NRHP: June 22, 1988

Bridge in Dreher Township is a historic stone arch bridge located in Dreher Township, Wayne County, Pennsylvania. It is a single span, high-rise stone arch built in 1934. It measures 34-foot-long (10 m) and crosses the Haags Mill Creek.

It was listed on the National Register of Historic Places in 1988.
