= Eugene Dorflinger Estate =

Historic house in Pennsylvania, United States

- U.S. National Register of Historic Places
- Pennsylvania state historical marker
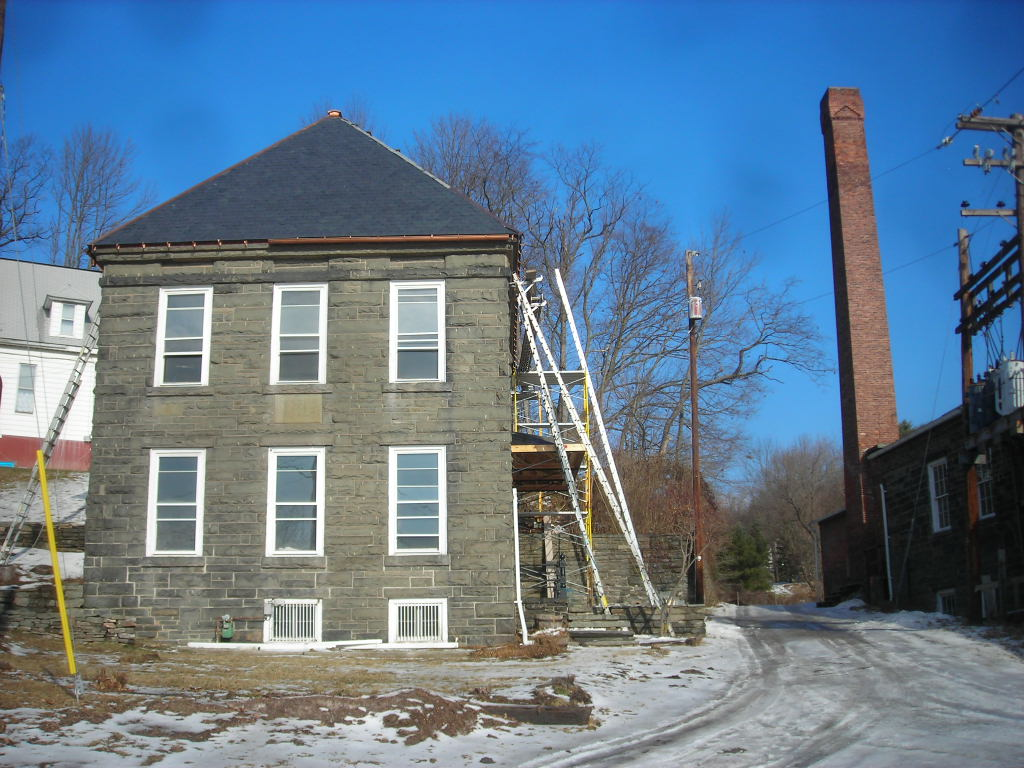

- Location within Pennsylvania Location within the United States
- Location: U.S. 6 and Charles St., U.S. Route 6 and Charles Street in White Mills, Texas Township, Pennsylvania
- Coordinates: 41°31′32″N 75°12′12″W
- Area: 3.5 acres (1.4 ha)
- Built: 1865
- NRHP reference No.: 78002483

Significant dates
- Added to NRHP: September 18, 1978
- Designated PHMC: June 28, 1951

Eugene Dorflinger Estate is a historic home and estate located at Texas Township, Wayne County, Pennsylvania. The house was built in 1865, and is a two-story, wood-frame dwelling with Victorian gingerbread trim. Also on the property are the contributing museum building, carriage house, photography studio, wash house, outhouse, and gazebo. The buildings are what is remaining from the Dorflinger Glass Works.

The property is now home to the Dorflinger-Suydam Wildlife Sanctuary, which protects almost 600 acres and features about 5 miles of trails.

The site also includes the Dorflinger Glass Museum that features over 900 pieces of cut lead crystal that were manufactured by the Dorflinger Glass Works.

The estate was added to the National Register of Historic Places in 1978.

== Gallery ==
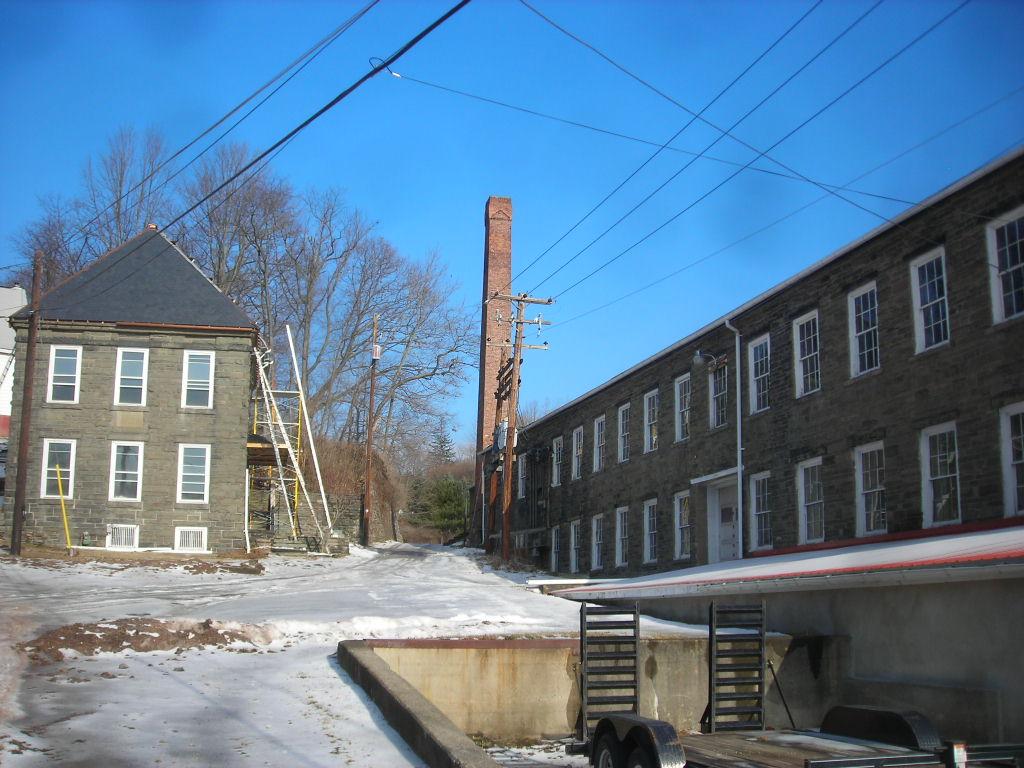

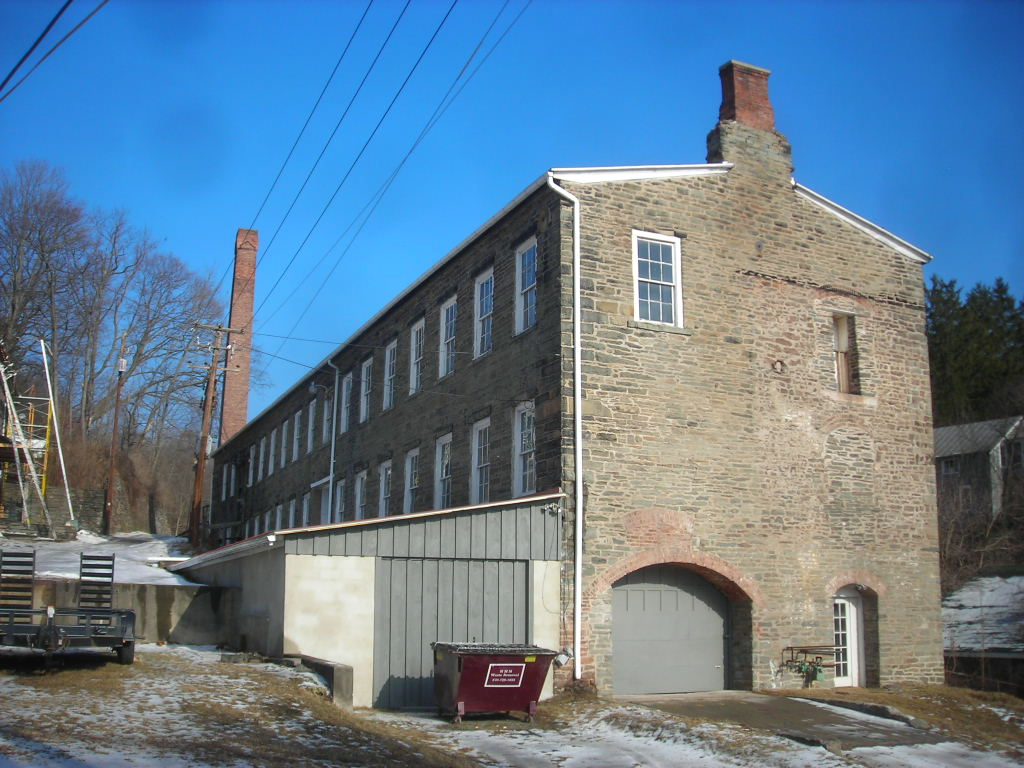

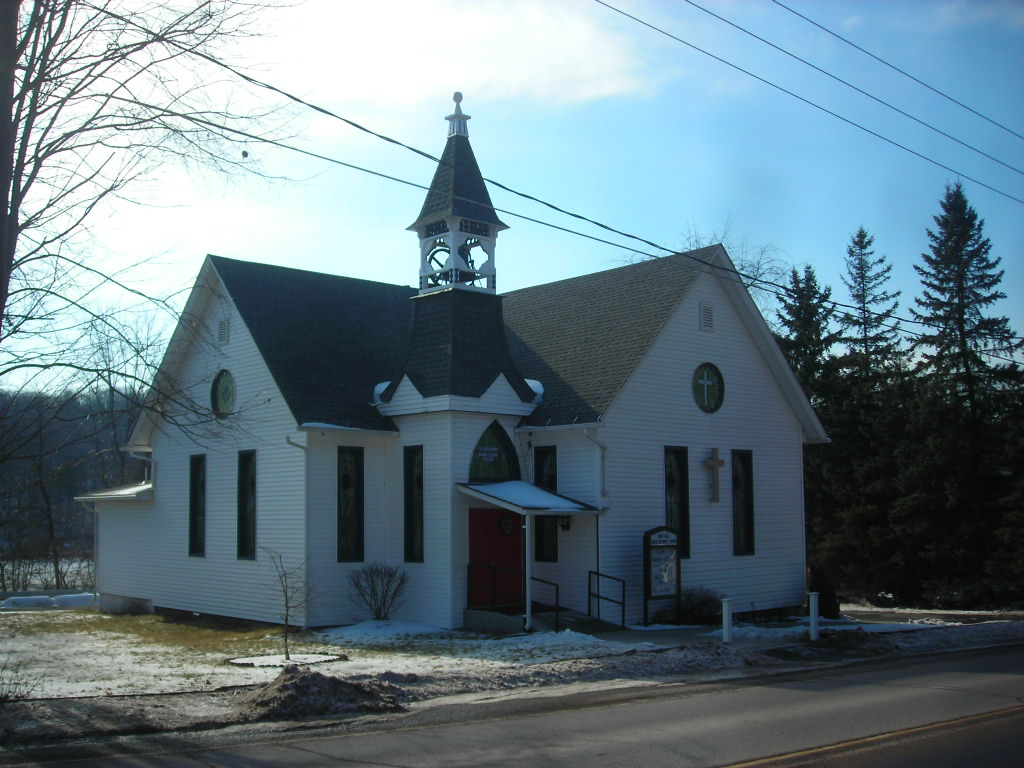
