= Dreher Township, Wayne County, Pennsylvania =

Township in Pennsylvania, US

Dreher, Pennsylvania
- Second-class township
- Township of Dreher
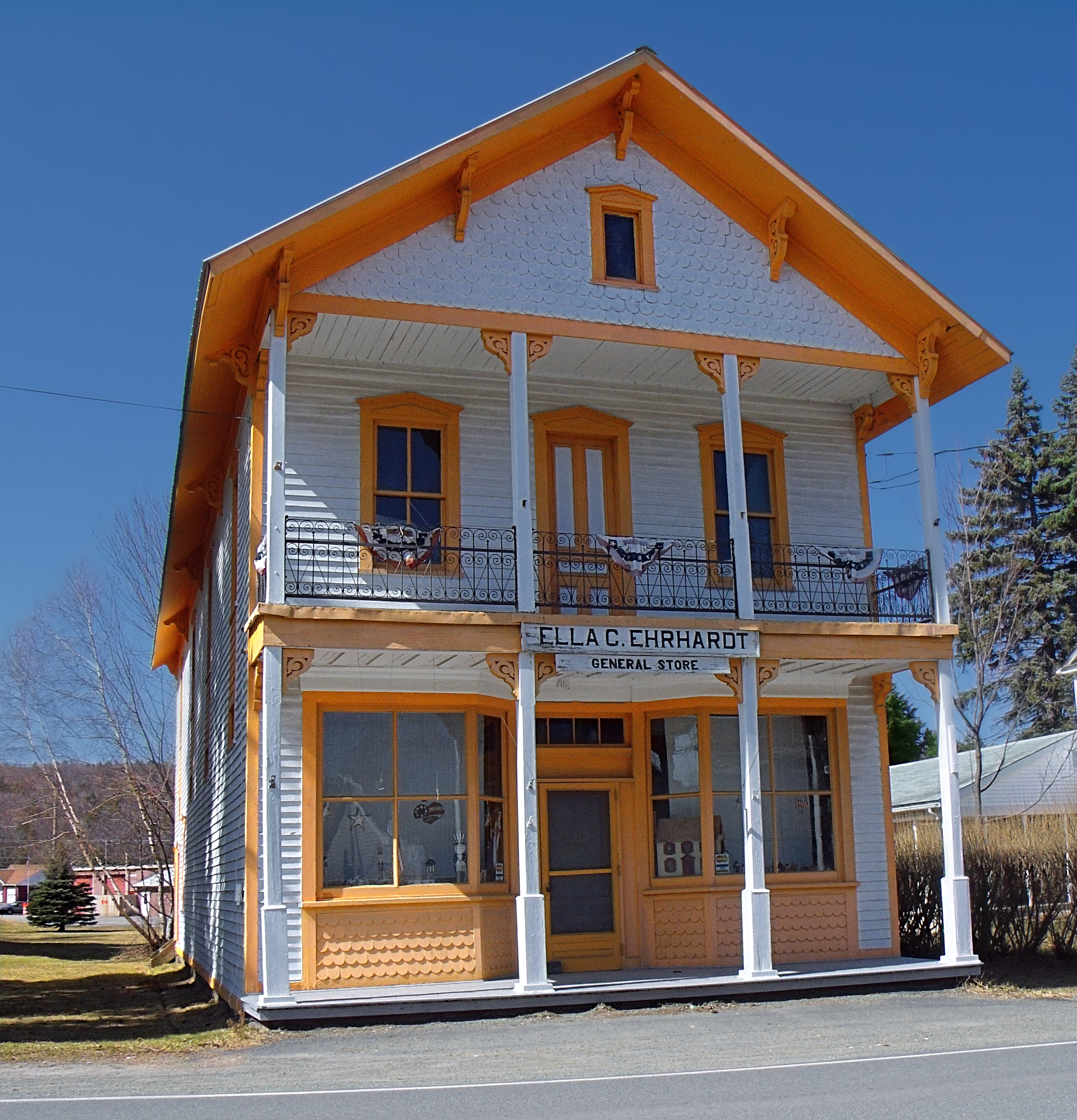
- The historic Ella C. Ehrhardt General Store in Newfoundland.

- Location in Wayne County and the state of Pennsylvania.
- Country: United States
- State: Pennsylvania
- US Congressional District: PA-8
- State Senatorial District: 20
- State House of Representatives District: 115
- County: Wayne
- School District: Wallenpaupack Area
- Settled: c. 1794
- Incorporated: September 7, 1877
- Founded by: Denman Coe
- Named after: Samuel S. Dreher

Government
  - Type: Board of Supervisors
  - Board of Supervisors: Supervisors: James Lee; John Young; Jerry McLain
  - US Representative: Matt Cartwright (D)
  - State Senator: Lisa Baker (R)
  - State Representative: Frank Farina (D)

Area
  - Total: 15.10 sq mi (39.12 km^{2})
  - Land: 14.85 sq mi (38.46 km^{2})
  - Water: 0.25 sq mi (0.66 km^{2})
- Elevation: 1,791 ft (546 m)

Population (2020)
  - Total: 1,350
  - Density: 91/sq mi (35.1/km^{2})
- Time zone: UTC-5 (Eastern (EST))
  - Summer (DST): UTC-4 (Eastern Daylight (EDT))
- Area codes: 570 & 272
- GNIS feature ID: 1217218
- FIPS code: 42-127-19864
- Website: www.drehertownship-pa.org

Dreher is a second-class township in Wayne County, Pennsylvania, United States. The township's population was 1,350 at the time of the 2020 United States Census.

== History ==
The Bridge in Dreher Township and Patriotic Order Sons of America Washington Camp 422 are listed on the National Register of Historic Places.

== Geography ==
According to the United States Census Bureau, the township has a total area of 15.1 square miles (39 km^{2}), of which 14.85 square miles (38.5 km^{2}) is land and 0.26 square miles (0.67 km^{2}) (1.69%) is water.

== Communities ==
The following villages are located in Dreher Township:

- Angels
- East Sterling
- Haags Mill
- Newfoundland
- South Sterling

In addition, the township is also home to one private community, Breezewood Acres.

== Demographics ==
Historical population
Census	Pop.	Note	%±
2010	1,412		—
2020	1,350		−4.4%
U.S. Decennial Census

As of the census of 2010, there were 1,412 people, 542 households, and 358 families residing in the township. The population density was 95.1 inhabitants per square mile (36.7/km^{2}). There were 703 housing units at an average density of 47.3/sq mi. The racial makeup of the township was 95.6% White, 2.1% African American, 0.3% Native American, 0.4% Asian, 0.1% Pacific Islander, 0.5% from other races, and 1% from two or more races. Hispanic or Latino of any race were 4.9% of the population.

There were 542 households, out of which 27.7% had children under the age of 18 living with them, 53.3% were married couples living together, 7.2% had a female householder with no husband present, and 33.9% were non-families. 28.4% of all households were made up of individuals, and 13.3% had someone living alone who was 65 years of age or older. The average household size was 2.44 and the average family size was 2.98.

In the township the population was spread out, with 20% under the age of 18, 63.1% from 18 to 64, and 16.9% who were 65 years of age or older. The median age was 45.6 years.

The median income for a household in the township was $32,639, and the median income for a family was $42,708. Males had a median income of $31,989 versus $22,109 for females. The per capita income for the township was $15,945. About 9.7% of families and 12.2% of the population were below the poverty line, including 16.3% of those under age 18 and 9.5% of those age 65 or over.
