= Hawley, Pennsylvania =

Borough in Pennsylvania, US

- Borough
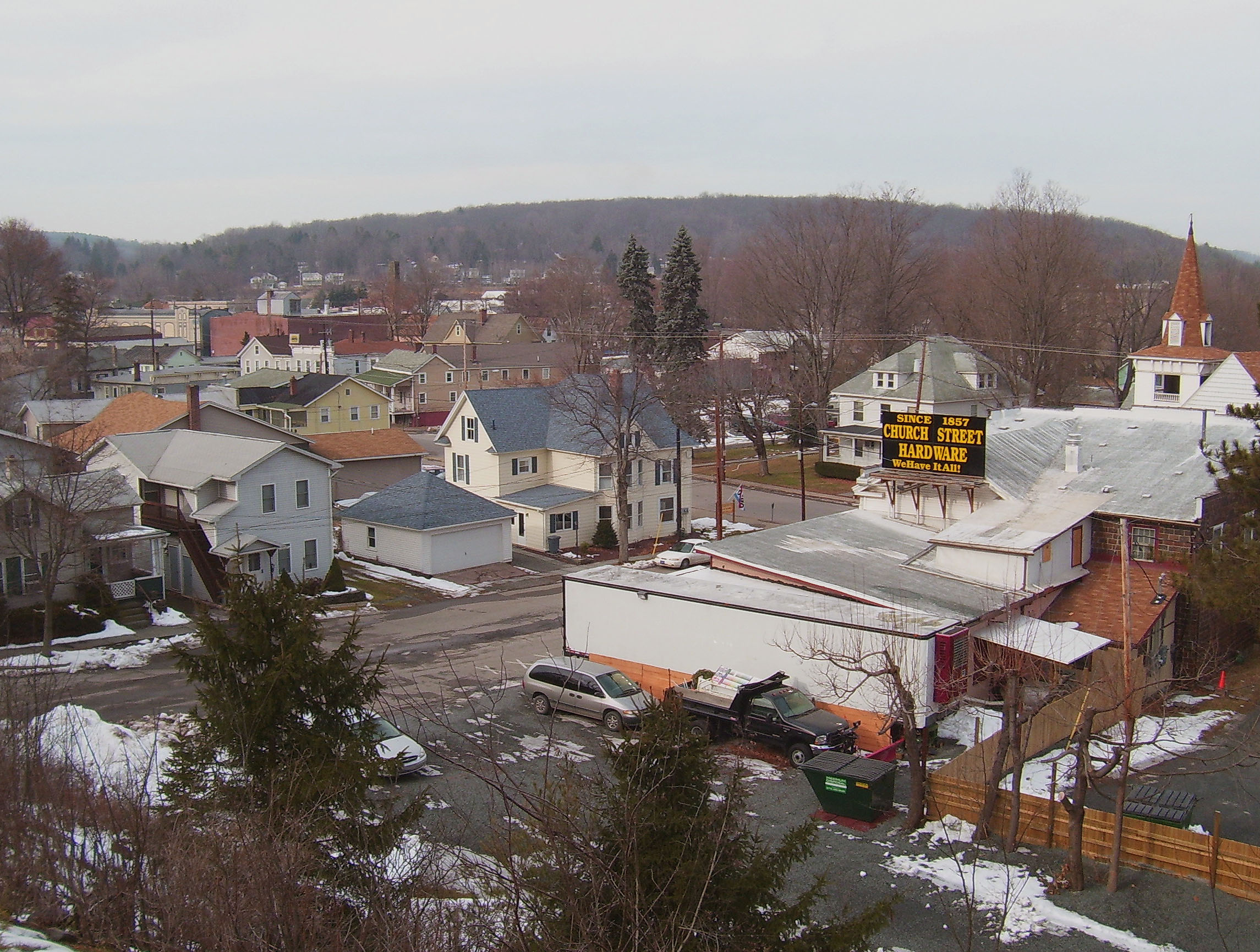

- Location in Wayne County and the U.S. state of Pennsylvania.
- Coordinates: 41°28′35″N 75°11′00″W
- Country: United States
- State: Pennsylvania
- County: Wayne
- Named for: Irad Hawley

Area
  - Total: 0.62 sq mi (1.60 km^{2})
  - Land: 0.58 sq mi (1.50 km^{2})
  - Water: 0.035 sq mi (0.09 km^{2})
- Elevation: 1,033 ft (315 m)

Population (2020)
  - Total: 1,229
  - Density: 2,116.4/sq mi (817.14/km^{2})
- Time zone: UTC-5 (EST)
  - Summer (DST): UTC-4 (EDT)
- ZIP code: 18428, 18438
- Area code(s): 570 and 272
- FIPS code: 42-33200
- Website: Hawley Borough

Hawley is a borough on the Lackawaxen River in Wayne County, Pennsylvania, United States. The borough's population was 1,229 at the time of the 2020 United States Census.

== History ==
The borough was named for Irad Hawley, first president of the Pennsylvania Coal Company. Early industry centered on the transportation and support of nearby coal mining operations along with manufacturing facilities. The Bellemonte Silk Mill, regarded as the largest bluestone building in the world, and J.S. O'Connor American Rich Cut Glassware Factory are listed on the National Register of Historic Places.

== Attractions and recreation ==
Hawley is home to a number of notable lakes, golf courses, and other recreational facilities, making it a leisure destination, particularly during the summer months. Local attractions include:

- Lake Wallenpaupack - a 13-mile long lake
- Woodloch Pines & Woodloch Springs - a resort and golf course
- The Hawley Silk Mill - the Bellemonte historical silk mill renovated by Peter Bohlin; now features shops, boutiques, a gym, a spa, offices and a college
- The Ritz Theater - a community theater offering musicals and straight comedies during the summer months and holidays.
- Hotel Belvidere - a historical hotel since 1902
- Lukan's Farm Resort - a family-owned countryside retreat, offering home-style meals, outdoor recreation, and more.

== Geography ==
Hawley is located where Middle Creek enters the Lackawaxen River, at 41°28′42″N 75°10′45″W (41.478225, -75.179154) at an elevation of 1,033 feet (314.9 m). Hawley students attend Wallenpaupack Areas Schools, with high, middle, and primary schools approximately five miles from town and located on the shores of Lake Wallenpaupack. Some kindergarten children attended school in the former Hawley High School, a WPA project and located in the borough, up until a few years ago when they were transferred back to the primary school.

According to the United States Census Bureau, the borough has a total area of 0.6 square miles (1.6 km^{2}), of which 0.6 square miles (1.6 km^{2}) is land and 0.04 square miles (0.10 km^{2}) (3.12%) is water.

=== Climate ===
Climate data for Hawley, Pennsylvania (1991–2020 normals, extremes 1897–2017)
Month	Jan	Feb	Mar	Apr	May	Jun	Jul	Aug	Sep	Oct	Nov	Dec	Year
Record high °F (°C)	72 (22)	72 (22)	85 (29)	93 (34)	94 (34)	98 (37)	100 (38)	100 (38)	100 (38)	91 (33)	82 (28)	69 (21)	100 (38)
Mean maximum °F (°C)	54.8 (12.7)	56.9 (13.8)	68.7 (20.4)	80.5 (26.9)	85.1 (29.5)	88.4 (31.3)	90.4 (32.4)	88.7 (31.5)	85.3 (29.6)	77.7 (25.4)	69.7 (20.9)	56.8 (13.8)	92.2 (33.4)
Mean daily maximum °F (°C)	33.0 (0.6)	35.7 (2.1)	44.6 (7.0)	57.5 (14.2)	68.9 (20.5)	76.7 (24.8)	81.3 (27.4)	79.4 (26.3)	72.8 (22.7)	60.8 (16.0)	48.6 (9.2)	37.9 (3.3)	58.1 (14.5)
Daily mean °F (°C)	23.2 (−4.9)	25.0 (−3.9)	33.3 (0.7)	44.8 (7.1)	55.9 (13.3)	64.6 (18.1)	69.1 (20.6)	67.0 (19.4)	60.2 (15.7)	48.6 (9.2)	38.0 (3.3)	28.9 (−1.7)	46.6 (8.1)
Mean daily minimum °F (°C)	13.5 (−10.3)	14.2 (−9.9)	22.0 (−5.6)	32.1 (0.1)	43.0 (6.1)	52.5 (11.4)	56.8 (13.8)	54.7 (12.6)	47.7 (8.7)	36.4 (2.4)	27.4 (−2.6)	20.0 (−6.7)	35.0 (1.7)
Mean minimum °F (°C)	−6.9 (−21.6)	−2.4 (−19.1)	4.4 (−15.3)	20.8 (−6.2)	29.7 (−1.3)	38.6 (3.7)	45.2 (7.3)	42.6 (5.9)	33.6 (0.9)	23.4 (−4.8)	14.7 (−9.6)	1.2 (−17.1)	−9.8 (−23.2)
Record low °F (°C)	−31 (−35)	−25 (−32)	−22 (−30)	4 (−16)	22 (−6)	31 (−1)	39 (4)	30 (−1)	22 (−6)	12 (−11)	−6 (−21)	−19 (−28)	−31 (−35)
Average precipitation inches (mm)	3.23 (82)	2.66 (68)	3.55 (90)	3.74 (95)	3.63 (92)	4.67 (119)	4.05 (103)	4.09 (104)	4.26 (108)	4.38 (111)	3.24 (82)	3.63 (92)	45.13 (1,146)
Average snowfall inches (cm)	13.0 (33)	13.2 (34)	9.4 (24)	1.1 (2.8)	0.0 (0.0)	0.0 (0.0)	0.0 (0.0)	0.0 (0.0)	0.0 (0.0)	0.3 (0.76)	1.3 (3.3)	9.1 (23)	47.1 (120)
Average precipitation days (≥ 0.01 in)	10.9	9.4	10.4	11.4	12.6	11.9	11.0	10.3	9.8	10.6	9.3	11.6	129.2
Average snowy days (≥ 0.1 in)	6.3	5.8	3.0	1.9	0.0	0.0	0.0	0.0	0.0	0.5	4.6	10.1	47.2
Source: NOAA (mean maxima/minima 1981–2010)

== Demographics ==
Historical population
Census	Pop.	Note	%±
1880	1,882		—
1890	1,968		4.6%
1900	1,925		−2.2%
1910	2,018		4.8%
1920	1,939		−3.9%
1930	1,811		−6.6%
1940	1,778		−1.8%
1950	1,602		−9.9%
1960	1,433		−10.5%
1970	1,331		−7.1%
1980	1,181		−11.3%
1990	1,244		5.3%
2000	1,303		4.7%
2010	1,211		−7.1%
2020	1,229		1.5%

Census data shows that as of 2021, there were 1,176 people, 539 households, and 611 housing units in Hawley. 53% of the population was female and 47% male. The racial makeup of the borough was 77% White, 2% African American, 1% Asian, 0% from other races, and 1% from two or more races. Hispanic or Latino of any race were 19% of the population. 4% of the population was foreign born, with 91% coming from Latin America, and 9% from Europe. 39% of the population was married and 61% single.

There were 539 households, out of which 44% were married couples living together, 22% had a female householder, 9% male householder, and 25% were non-families. The average household size was 2.2. Of the 611 housing units, 88% were occupied and 50% owner-occupied. 60% of the housing units were single unit, 36% multi-unit, and 4% mobile home. The median value of owner-occupied housing units was $145,900 - about 75% of the county and state median.

The median age of borough residents was 46.1, about 10% higher than the state median. 12% of residents were under the age of 18, 69% from 18 to 64, and 19% were 65 years of age or older.

The median household income in the borough was $41,385, while per capita income was $24,582, both below the state medians. 19.4% of the population were below the poverty line, including 22% of those under age 18 and 13% of those age 65 or over. 88.4% had a high school degree or better, and 19.7% had a bachelor's degree or better.

== Notable people ==
- Homer Bigart, two-time Pulitzer Prize winning reporter
- John J. Boyle, 19th Public Printer of the United States (attended Hawley High School)
- Charlie Gelbert, football player; member of the College Football Hall of Fame
- Michael John Hoban, prelate of the Roman Catholic Church
- Robert Koenig, film director, producer, and writer
- James W. McAndrew, U.S. Army major general
- Rick Schmidlin, film producer
- Norman Welton, Associated Press journalist/photo editor

== Gallery ==
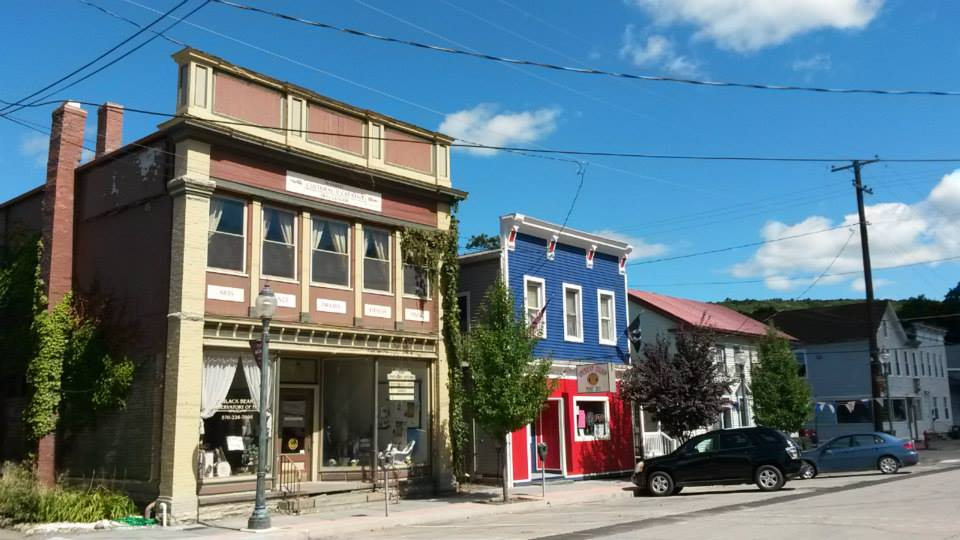

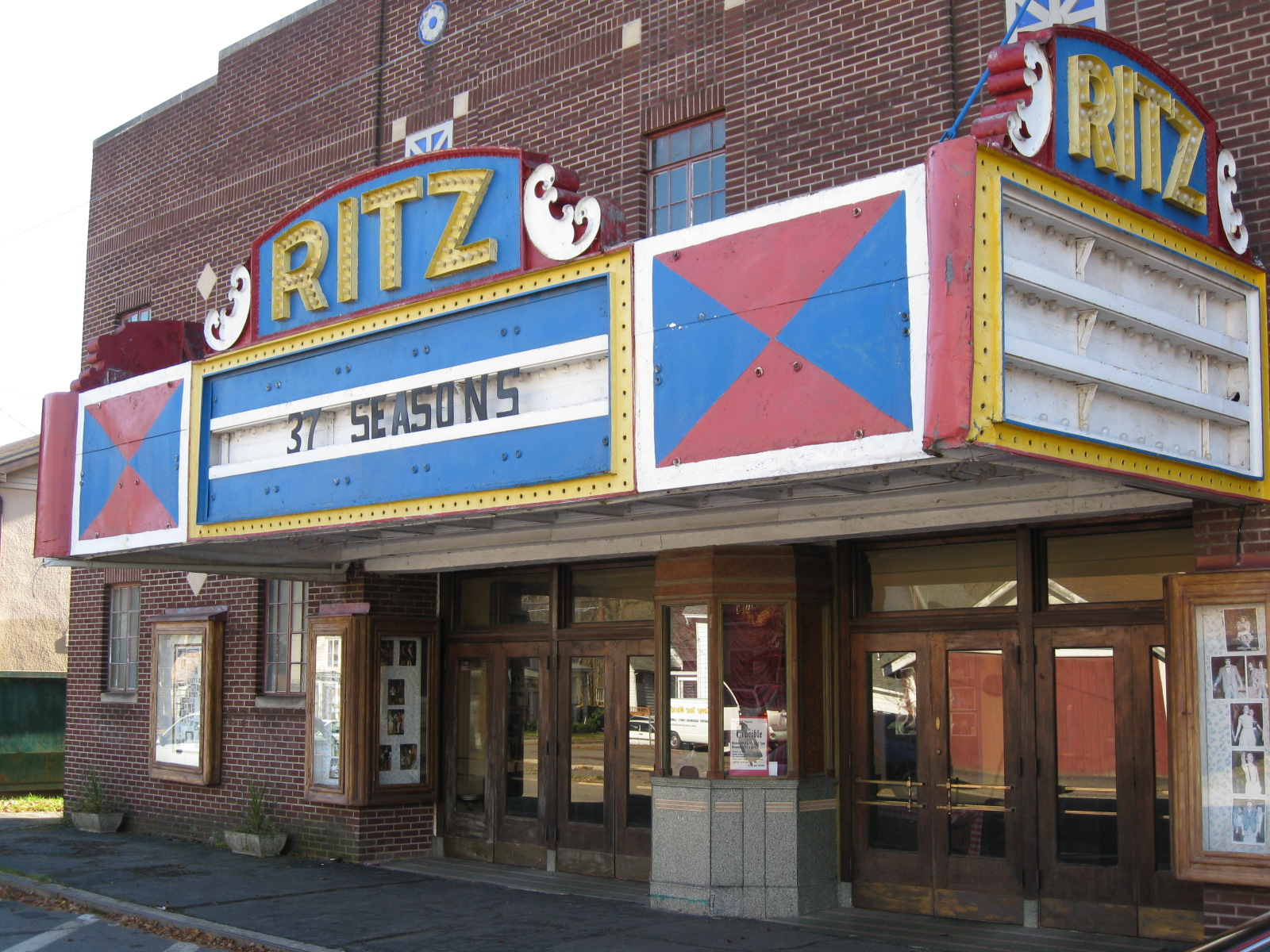
The Ritz Theater in Hawley

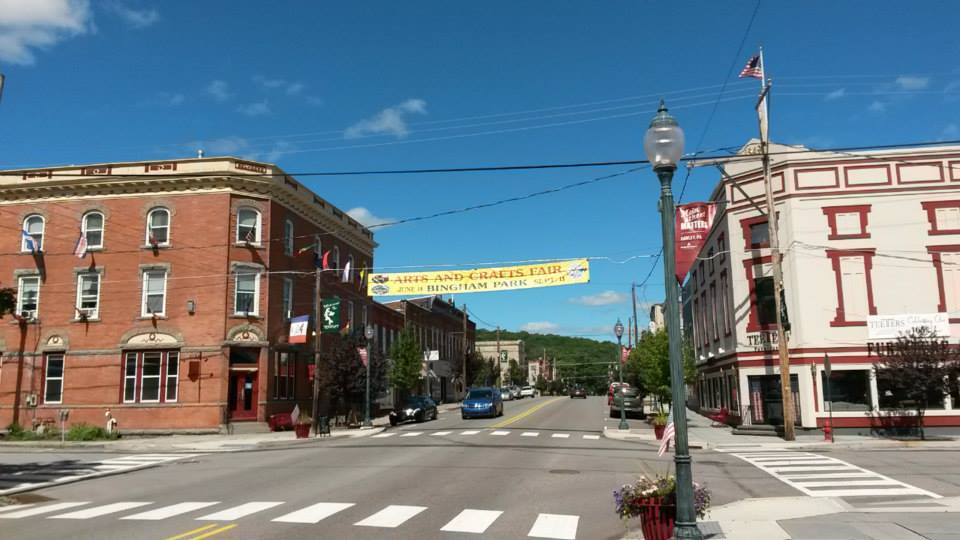
Photo of Main Avenue

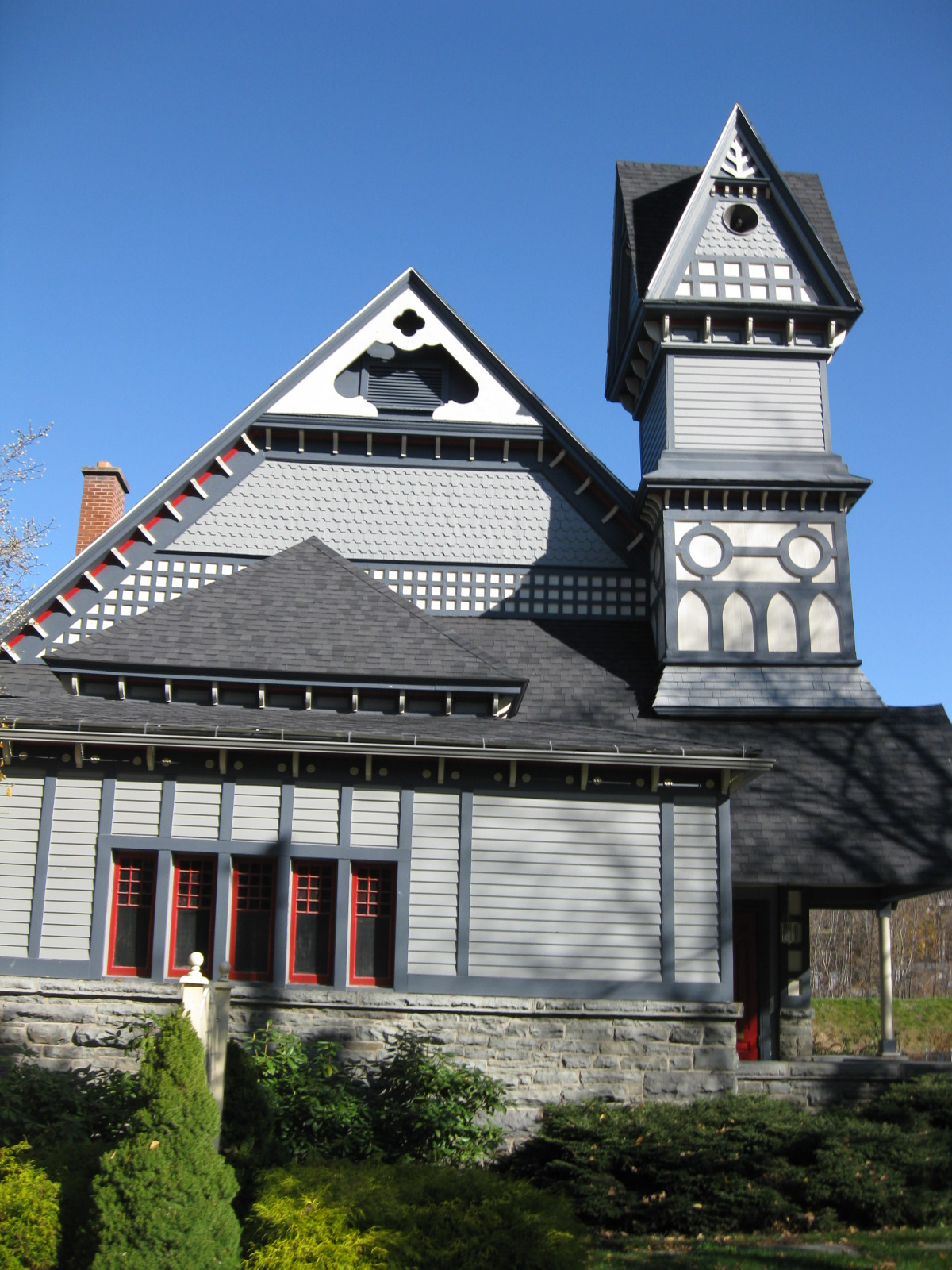
Presbyterian church

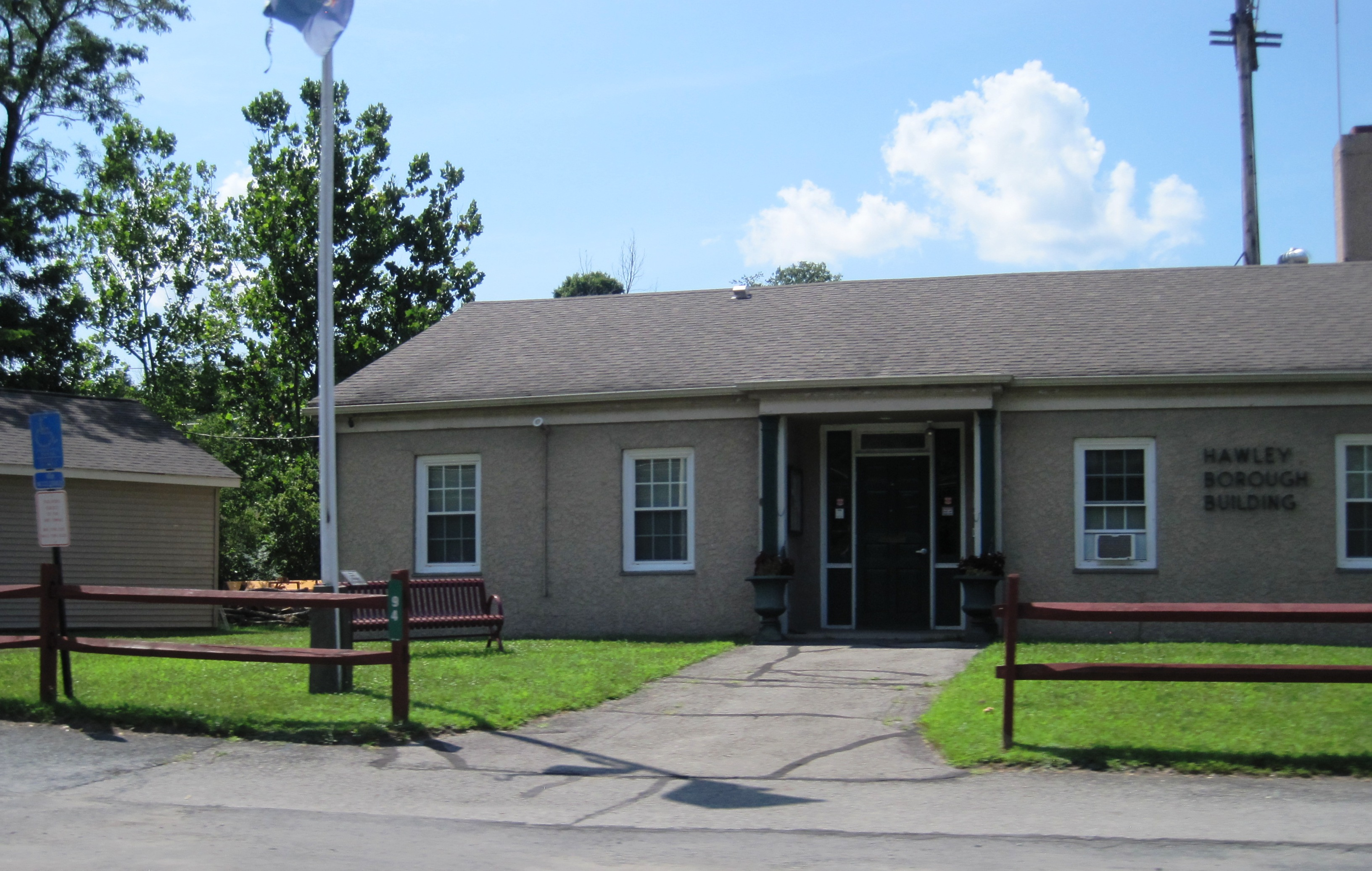
Hawley Borough Building
