= 1802 in literature =

This article contains information about the literary events and publications of 1802.

== Events ==
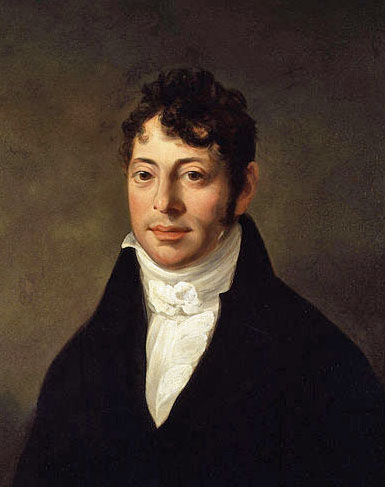
1807 portrait of Joseph Grimaldi by John Cawse

- April 15 – William and his sister Dorothy Wordsworth walk by Ullswater and see a belt of daffodils, which inspires his poem "I Wandered Lonely as a Cloud", written two years later.
- April 19 – Joseph Grimaldi first presents his white-faced clown character "Joey", at Sadler's Wells Theatre in London.Sadler's Wells had closed for refurbishment at the end of its 1801 season and re-opened on 19 April 1802; Grimaldi returned to take a major role in the Easter pantomime, for which he designed the look of his recurring Clown character "Joey". He began by painting a white base over his face, neck and chest before adding red triangles on the cheeks, thick eyebrows and large red lips set in a mischievous grin. Grimaldi's design is used by many modern clowns. According to Grimaldi's biographer Andrew McConnell Stott, it was one of the most important theatrical designs of the 1800s.
- Summer – Adam Oehlenschläger writes at one sitting the poem "Guldhornene", introducing Romanticism into Danish poetry.
- July 31 – William Wordsworth, leaving London for Dover and Calais with Dorothy, witnesses an early morning scene he captures in a Petrarchan sonnet "Composed upon Westminster Bridge". In Calais, he will meet his 9-year-old illegitimate daughter Caroline for the first time.
- October 4 – William Wordsworth marries Mary Hutchinson at Brompton, Scarborough.
- October 10 – The Edinburgh Review, a reforming quarterly, is first published.
- November 13 – The first play in English explicitly called a melodrama ("mélodrame") is performed in London: Thomas Holcroft's Gothic A Tale of Mystery (an unacknowledged translation of de Pixerécourt's Cœlina, ou, l'enfant du mystère), at the Theatre Royal, Covent Garden.
- November 15 – Washington Irving makes a first appearance in print at the age of nineteen, with observational letters to the New York Morning Chronicle under the name Jonathan Oldstyle.
- December 2–3 – Jane Austen accepts, then rejects, a proposal of marriage from Harris Bigg-Wither at his Hampshire home.
- unknown dates
  - Henry Boyd completes the first full English translation of Dante's Divine Comedy.
  - Abraham Hyacinthe Anquetil-Duperron's Latin translation of Oupneck'hat is published, the first published translation of the Upanishads into a Western language.
  - The first part of Jippensha Ikku's picaresque novel Tōkaidōchū Hizakurige (東海道中膝栗毛, Shank's Mare) is published in Japan.

== New books ==
=== Fiction ===
- François-René de Chateaubriand – René
- Elizabeth Craven – The Soldiers of Dierenstein
- John Gilchrist – Hindee Story Teller
- Elizabeth Gunning – The Farmer's Boy
- Jane Harvey – Warkfield Castle
- Rachel Hunter – The History of the Grubthorpe Family
- Isabella Kelly – The Baron's Daughter
- Francis Lathom – Astonishment
- Mary Meeke
  - Independence
  - Midnight Weddings
- Mary Pilkington – The Accusing Spirit
- Anne Louise Germaine de Stael – Delphine
- Jane West – The Infidel Father

=== Drama ===
- Mary Berry – Fashionable Friends
- James Boaden – The Voice of Nature
- Charles-Guillaume Étienne – Les Deux Mères
- Thomas Morton – Beggar My Neighbour
- Heinrich Joseph von Collin – Coriolan
- Frederick Reynolds – Delays and Blunders
- Lumley Skeffington – The Word of Honour

=== Poetry ===
- Walter Scott, ed. – Minstrelsy of the Scottish Border

=== Non-fiction ===
- Saul Ascher – Ideen zur natürlichen Geschichte der politischen Revolutionen (Ideas toward a Natural History of Political Revolutions)
- Jeremy Bentham – Civil War and Penal Legislation
- Jacob Boehme – Les Trois Principes de l'Essence Divine (translated into French by Louis Claude de Saint-Martin)
- François-René de Chateaubriand – Génie du christianisme (The Genius of Christianity)
- John Debrett – Debrett's Peerage (first edition)
- John Home – History of the Rebellion of 1745
- Malcolm Laing – History of Scotland from the Union of the Crowns to the Union of the Kingdoms
- Louis Claude de Saint-Martin – Le Ministère de l'homme-esprit
- Friedrich Wilhelm Joseph Schelling – Bruno oder über das göttliche und natürliche Prinzip der Dinge (Bruno, or On the Natural and the Divine Principle of Things)
- Joanna Southcott – The Strange Effects of Faith; with Remarkable Prophecies (with fifth and final part)
- Noah Webster – The Rights of Neutral Nations in Time of War

== Births ==
- January 9 – Catharine Parr Traill, English-Canadian memoirist and children's author (died 1899)
- February 11 – Lydia Maria Child, American abolitionist, activist, novelist, and journalist (died 1880)
- February 26 – Victor Hugo, French novelist and poet (died 1885)
- June 2 – Karl Lehrs, German classicist (died 1878)
- June 12 – Harriet Martineau, English social theorist (died 1876)
- July 10 – Robert Chambers, Scottish writer and publisher (died 1871)
- July 24 – Alexandre Dumas, père, French novelist (died 1870)
- July 28 – Winthrop Mackworth Praed, English poet (died 1839)
- August 14 - Letitia Elizabeth Landon, English poet and novelist (died 1838)
- August 25 – Nikolaus Lenau, Hungarian-born German poet (died 1850)
- November 29 – Wilhelm Hauff, German poet and novelist (died 1827)
- December 8 – Alexander Odoevsky, Russian poet (died 1839)
- December 23 – Sara Coleridge, English poet and translator (died 1852)
- December 31 – Richard Henry Horne, English poet, critic and journalist, and public official in Australia (died 1884)

== Deaths ==
- February 26 – Alexander Geddes, Scottish theologian, scholar and priest (born 1737)
- April 18 – Erasmus Darwin, English poet and natural philosopher (born 1731)
- June 5 – Johann Christian Gottlieb Ernesti, German classicist (born 1756)
- June 20 – Sophia Burrell, English poet and dramatist (born 1753)
- June 29 – Johann Jakob Engel, German teacher and writer (born 1741)
- August 10 – Franz Aepinus, German natural philosopher (born 1724)
- December 27 – Thomas Cadell, English bookseller and publisher (born 1742)

== Sources ==
- McConnell Stott, Andrew (2009). The Pantomime Life of Joseph Grimaldi. Edinburgh: Canongate Books Ltd. ISBN 978-1-84767-761-7.
