= Frank Raubicheck =

American painter

Frank Raubicheck (1857–1952) was an American painter and etcher who arrived in the United States from Bohemia in the 1870s. He was an art student at the Ludwig-Maximilians-Universität München and began his career as a painter while still in Europe. His style has been compared to that of Claude Monet.

In the 1880s, Raubicheck painted and sold many impressionist landscapes, many of which are scenes on the East End of Long Island. He also established himself during this time as an etcher of some renown. One of his works is in the permanent collection of the Parrish Art Museum in Southampton, New York and several appear in an edition of Washington Irving's Knickerbocker's History of New York, published in 1886 by the Grolier Club in New York. He was one of the creators of the official seal for the Grolier Club, which still hangs on the banner outside the club's E. 60th Street address in Manhattan.

In 1892, he exhibited more than 40 paintings at the Fifth Avenue Auction House in New York under the management of William B. Norman and the E. W. Noyes Gallery in Boston, Massachusetts. These paintings were a result of three years' work in Bavaria, the Netherlands and Belgium. In the mid-1890s, he went to work as an etcher and illustrator for The New York Times and worked there until the paper moved from Park Row to midtown in 1906.

He continued painting throughout the remainder of his life, which was spent in Cambridge, Massachusetts, and Hartsdale, New York, in Westchester County.
