= Letters of Jonathan Oldstyle, Gent. =

The Letters of Jonathan Oldstyle, Gent.
- Author: Washington Irving
- Language: English
- Genre: Observational letters & Essays
- Publisher: Morning Chronicle (New York City)
- Publication date: 1802-1803
- Publication place: United States
- Media type: Print (Newspaper)
- ISBN: 978-0-940450-14-1 (reprint)
- OCLC: 9412147
- Dewey Decimal: 818/.209 19
- LC Class: PS2052 1983
- Followed by: Salmagundi

The Letters of Jonathan Oldstyle, Gent. (1802) is a collection of nine observational letters written by American writer Washington Irving under the pseudonym Jonathan Oldstyle. The letters first appeared in the November 15, 1802, edition of the New York Morning Chronicle, a political-leaning newspaper partially owned by New Yorker Aaron Burr and edited by Irving's brother Peter. The letters were printed at irregular intervals until April 23, 1803. The letters lampoon marriage, manners, dress, and culture of early 19th-century New York City. They are Irving's début in print.

== Letters to the Morning Chronicle ==
=== Letters 1 and 2: Marriage and manners ===
Irving's first Oldstyle letter appeared in the November 15, 1802, edition of the Morning Chronicle. In his first letter, Irving mocked the current trends in dress and fashion, training most of his criticism on young men and their "most studied carelessness, and almost slovenliness of dress," who are more interested in themselves than in the unfortunate "belle who has to undergo the fatigue of dragging along this sluggish animal." The signature in all capital letters at the end of the piece was not Irving's own, but rather the first of many pseudonyms Irving would adopt throughout his literary life, Jonathan Oldstyle.

A second letter followed on November 20, this time poking fun at the "strange and preposterous … manner in which modern marriages are conducted." Describing the marriage between Oldstyle's aunt Barbara and an ironically-named Squire Stylish, Irving juxtaposed modern manners against old etiquette, concluding that no one could read such a comparison of old versus new, "and not lament, with me, the degeneracy of the present times — what husband is there but will look back with regret, to the happy days of female subjugation[?]"

=== Letters 6, 7 and 8: Theatrical controversy ===
Oldstyle's commentary on the theater riled some in the New York theater district, but when Irving trained Oldstyle's fire on local critics — specifically William Coleman at the Evening Post and James Cheetham at the American Citizen — tempers finally flared.

The ruckus began with Irving's January 17, 1803, letter, his sixth, in which "Quoz", a new character introduced by Irving as a friend of Oldstyle's, took a backhanded shot at critics for taking all the fun out of the theater: "The critics, my dear Jonathan, are the very pests of society … they reduce our feelings to a state of miserable refinement, and destroy entirely all the enjoyments in which our coarser sensations delighted."

Five days later, in his seventh letter, Irving had Oldstyle complain about the play "The Wheel of Truth," knowing it would provoke a response from Coleman and Cheetham, who had been feuding publicly about the authorship of the play. Irving's letter had the desired effect, as Cheetham and Coleman elevated their attacks on the play's author, its actors, and each other.

Delighted with the reaction, Irving responded in mock innocence on February 8 that he was "perfectly at a loss" as to what all the fuss was about, and couldn't resist giving Oldstyle the last word, concluding that all the bickering had "awakened doubt in my mind respecting the sincerity and justice of the Critics."

=== Letter 9: Dueling ===
Irving's final letter appeared two months later, the gap between appearances likely an indication of Irving's growing lack of interest in the exercise. In his letter of April 23, 1803, Irving — writing again as Quoz — discussed the practice of dueling, which had recently been formally outlawed in New York. Declaring the practice of dueling with pistols "unceremonious," Quoz recommends instead that duelists draw lots to see who gets to have a brick dropped on his head from a window. "If he survives, well and good", Quoz says, "if he falls, why nobody is to blame, it was purely accidental." Quoz even suggests that dueling be licensed by "the Blood and Thunder office" of the state as an official event, where the public can watch, as "this would be a valuable addition to the list of our refined amusements."

== Public reaction ==
The Oldstyle letters were well received in New York—and despite the use of the pseudonym, Irving's identity as Oldstyle was not a secret. The public enjoyed them, and Chronicle co-publisher Aaron Burr was impressed enough to send copies of the first five letters to his daughter Theodosia, remarking that they "would not, perhaps, merit so high an honour as that of being perused by your eyes and touched by your fair hands, but that [they are] the production of a youth of about nineteen, the youngest brother of Dr. Peter Irving of New York."

Irving also had an admirer in Charles Brockden Brown, who unsuccessfully tried to track down Oldstyle to ask his assistance with The Literary Magazine, and American Register that Brown would shortly be editing in Philadelphia.

William Dunlap, manager of New York's Park Theater, also thought highly of Oldstyle, later calling Irving's letters "pleasant effusions," but noted politely at the time that the irritation Oldstyle was provoking in his actors was "excessive". Even William Coleman at the competing Evening Post thought Irving, for all his Oldstyle bluster, had talent as a critic.

== Publishing history ==
While Oldstyle marks Irving's first foray into print, Irving would always look back on the nine letters as "crude and boyish." To Irving's embarrassment, several letters were reprinted in pamphlet form in New York and London in 1824 following the success of The Sketch Book. Irving would not include any of the Oldstyle letters in the Author's Revised Edition he put together for publisher George Putnam in the 1850s.

The first five letters finally appeared in Putnam's 1866 edition of Spanish Papers and Other Miscellanies, and were reprinted regularly up to the end of the nineteenth century. All nine letters were eventually included in the sixth volume of the 30-volume The Complete Works of Washington Irving, collecting Irving's works, letters, and papers. The Oldstyle letters reprinted in the Library of America edition of Irving's works are based on that text.

== Literary tradition ==
Observational letters, like Irving's Oldstyle letters, are a tradition that date in America as far back as the 1720s, when Benjamin Franklin wrote similar letters to the New-England Courant under the name of Silence Dogood. Franklin had borrowed the form from Joseph Addison, who Franklin admired, and who was known for the gentlemanly "Mr. Spectator" essays he wrote in the Guardian, Tatler and The Spectator in London in the early eighteenth century. Such essays had been a staple of colonial newspapers, and usually featured an observer –- normally a bachelor, with a personality that differed from that of the writer –- who commented, either directly or indirectly, on public truths.
