= Peter Irving =

American politician

Member of the New York State Assembly for New York County
- In office January 25, 1803 – April 26, 1803

Personal details
- Born: October 30, 1771 New York City, Province of New York, British America
- Died: June 27, 1838 (aged 66) New York City, New York, U.S.
- Resting place: Sleepy Hollow Cemetery, New York
- Party: Democratic-Republican
- Relations: Washington Irving (brother); William Irving (brother)
- Parent(s): William Irving Sr. Sarah Sanders Irving
- Education: Columbia University

Peter Irving (October 30, 1771 – June 27, 1838) was an American medical doctor, writer, and politician who was the brother of Washington Irving, William Irving and John T. Irving.

== Early life ==
Irving was born in New York City on October 30, 1771. He was one of eleven children born to William Irving Sr. (1731–1807), originally of Quholm, Shapinsay, Orkney, Scotland, and Sarah (née Sanders) Irving (1738–1817). Among his surviving siblings were four brothers and three sisters, including: U.S. Representative William Irving, Ebenezer Irving, John Treat Irving, diplomat and author Washington Irving, Ann Irving (wife of Maj. Gen. Richard Dodge), Catherine Irving, and Sarah Irving.

== Career ==
Irving studied medicine at Columbia College, taking his degree in 1794. He was editor of the New York newspaper The Morning Chronicle (founded by Aaron Burr) and the weekly Corrector, to which his friend William Alexander Duer contributed and which supported Aaron Burr in his contest with Morgan Lewis for New York Governor. His brother Washington Irving made his literary debut in The Morning Chronicle and later covered the Burr Trial for the newspaper.

Like his brothers William and John, Peter was a member of the Calliopean Society, a literary club for young men that sometimes met at William's house. He translated Giovanni Sbogarro: A Venetian Tale. Reportedly,

"Peter was atypical of the partisan editors of the period. He was too reserved to print obvious lies, or to pass on ugly rumors and pitch abusive words at Burr's enemies. Cheetham derided him by calling him 'Miss' Irving, a direct allusion to his sexual identity. Civil Peter knew whom he could turn to for help: Washington resented Cheetham's unprovoked assaults on his brother, including the suggestion (with clear homosexual overtones) that he was merely the slavish follower of a known libertine."

In 1803, Irving served in the New York State Assembly as a member of the 26th New York State Legislature, representing New York County alongside John Burger, William Few (later a U.S. Senator from Georgia), Speaker Thomas Storm, and Daniel D. Tompkins (later Governor of New York and Vice President of the United States). He ran for reelection, and lost, as a Burrite. Peter also wrote the first five chapters of his brother Washington's 1809 satirical novel, Knickerbocker's History.

From 1809 until 1836, Irving lived in Europe for nearly 25 years, returning just two years before his eventual death in 1838.

== Personal life ==
Peter, a bachelor like his brother Washington, spent his final days in New York City with Washington, who came to visit from his cottage Sunnyside in Tarrytown. Peter died on June 27, 1838. He is buried at Sleepy Hollow Cemetery.

=== Legacy ===
His papers are held variously at the Sterling Memorial Library, Yale University, the Miriam Lutcher Stark Library, the University of Texas and The New York Public Library. A selection of his writings are published in a slim volume.
