= Washington Irving in the Archives of Seville =

Painting by David Wilkie

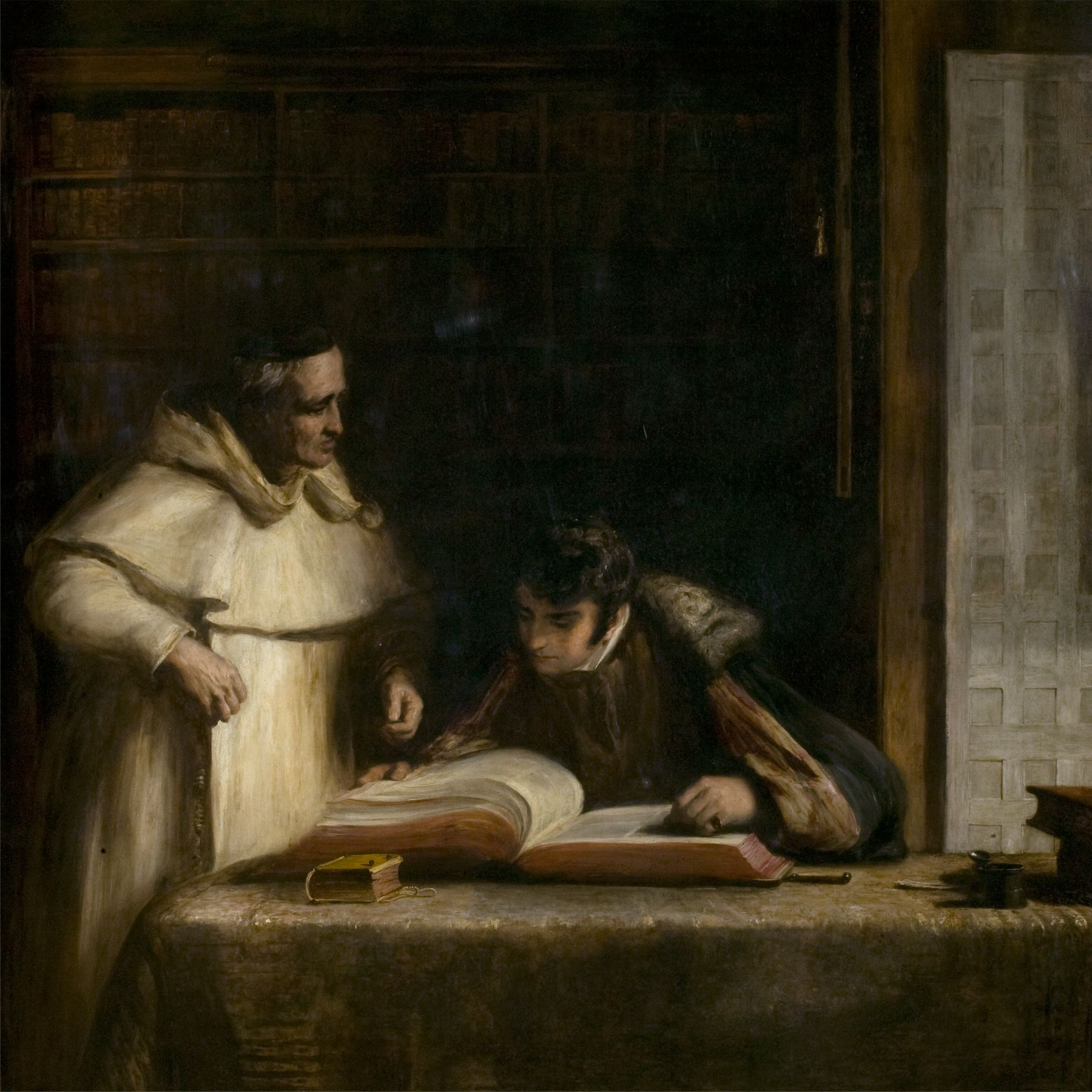
- Artist: David Wilkie
- Year: 1828
- Type: Oil on canvas
- Dimensions: 122.6 cm × 122.6 cm (48.3 in × 48.3 in)
- Location: Leicester Museum and Art Gallery; Leicester

Washington Irving in the Archives of Seville is a painting of 1828 by the British artist David Wilkie. It depicts a visit by the American writer Washington Irving to a library in Seville.

Irving was in Spain researching a follow-up to his biography of Christopher Columbus, A Chronicle of the Conquest of Granada. Wilkie travelled there following a nervous breakdown during which he had stopped working. The two men became friends and Wilkie was able to produce several works set during the Peninsular War, which revived his career. They were exhibited at the Royal Academy Exhibition of 1829 and were acquired by George IV for the Royal Collection.

This more personal work shows Irving hunched over a historic book with a monk standing beside him. Today it is in the collection of the Leicester Museum and Art Gallery.

== Bibliography ==
- Tschachler, Heinz. Washington Irving and the Fantasy of Masculinity. McFarland, 2022.
- Tromans, Nicholas. David Wilkie: The People's Painter. Edinburgh University Press, 2007.
