= John Quidor =

American painter (1801–1881)

- Born: January 26, 1801; Tappan, New York, U.S.
- Died: December 14, 1881 (aged 80); Jersey City, New Jersey, U.S.
- Education: John Wesley Jarvis
- Known for: Painting, History painting
- Notable work: Dorothea (1823); The Headless Horseman Pursuing Ichabod Crane (1858); The Money Diggers (1832); Leatherstocking's Rescue (q.v.)

John Quidor (January 26, 1801 – December 13, 1881) was an American painter of historical and literary subjects. About 35 of Quidor's canvases are known to survive, most of which are based on Washington Irving's stories about Dutch New York, drawing inspiration from the Hudson Valley and from such English painters as William Hogarth, Isaac Cruikshank, James Gillray, Joseph Wright of Derby, and George Morland.

== Biography ==
John Quidor was born in 1801 in Tappan, New York. His family moved to New York City in 1810. In 1818, at the age 17, he began an apprenticeship with John Wesley Jarvis (where artist Henry Inman was also training), which was the only artistic training he received. The apprenticeship was not a success. Quidor felt that Jarvis did not pay sufficient attention to him, favoring Inman over him, leading Quidor in 1822 to sue Jarvis for breach of indenture, winning damages of $251.35 ($6,959.95 in 2025 dollars). Because he had to admit that he had received inadequate training, the lawsuit damaged his reputation more than Jarvis'.

Following his apprenticeship, Quidor earned a living by painting banners and doing decorative work on steamboats and fire engines for New York's fire companies.

None of his decorative work is known to have survived. Starting in 1823, he began creating paintings based on literary themes, including his first two efforts, Dorothea and Don Quixote Imagines Melisendra’s Rescue by a Moor, both paintings based on the Miguel de Cervantes novel, Don Quixote; then following with Washington Irving's short stories Legend of Sleepy Hollow and Rip Van Winkle and James Fenimore Cooper's book The Pioneers. During this part of his career, he took on Thomas Bangs Thorpe and Charles Loring Elliott as his apprentices. Of his time working for Quidor, Thorpe recalled that "in all the time we were with Quidor, many months, I do not remember of his giving us anything but easel room and one or two very common engravings to copy. He would absent himself from his studio for days and weeks together. When present, if not painting on a banner or engine back, he would generally lie at full length on the long bench."

A fire destroyed Quidor's studio, located at 46 Canal Street, on December 16, 1835. That incident, combined with two major cholera outbreaks in the area and a financial crash in the late 1830s, led Quidor to abandon New York. He moved to Quincy, Illinois, in 1837, and, in 1844, purchased an $8,000 ($331,985.70 in 2025 dollars) farm, which he paid for by painting eight large religious canvases based on engravings of works by Benjamin West. These canvases were exhibited in New York in 1847, but their whereabouts and status are currently unknown.

In 1851 Quidor returned to New York where he stayed until his retirement in 1869. During this period, his style changed. He simplified his compositions and used a narrower range of colors, which he thinned with varnish so that his stylized, nervously rendered figures nearly disappeared into hazy backgrounds. He apparently stopped painting in 1868. He lived in Jersey City, New Jersey, where his eldest daughter lived, from 1869 until his death in 1881.

== Career ==
Little appreciated in his time, Quidor was rediscovered as an important figure in American art after a 1942 exhibition of his works at the Brooklyn Museum of Art.

His paintings establish a mysterious romantic setting for scenes in which he mingled macabre elements with an earthy humor. Many of his works, such as The Headless Horseman Pursuing Ichabod Crane, in the Smithsonian American Art Museum, were inspired by the writings of Washington Irving. Irving's A History of New York gave Quidor the subjects for the four paintings in the Brooklyn Museum of Art: Dancing on the Battery (c. 1860), Peter Stuyvesant's Wall Street Gate (1864), Voyage of the Good Oloff up the Hudson (1866), and The Voyage from Communipaw to Hell Gate (1866). These show Quidor's characteristic mellow and harmonious color, poetic imagination, and naïve humor.

Also in the Brooklyn Museum of Art are his three paintings Dorothea, Money Diggers, and Wolfert's Will. He sometimes painted religious subjects, such as Jesus Blessing the Sick.

== Gallery ==
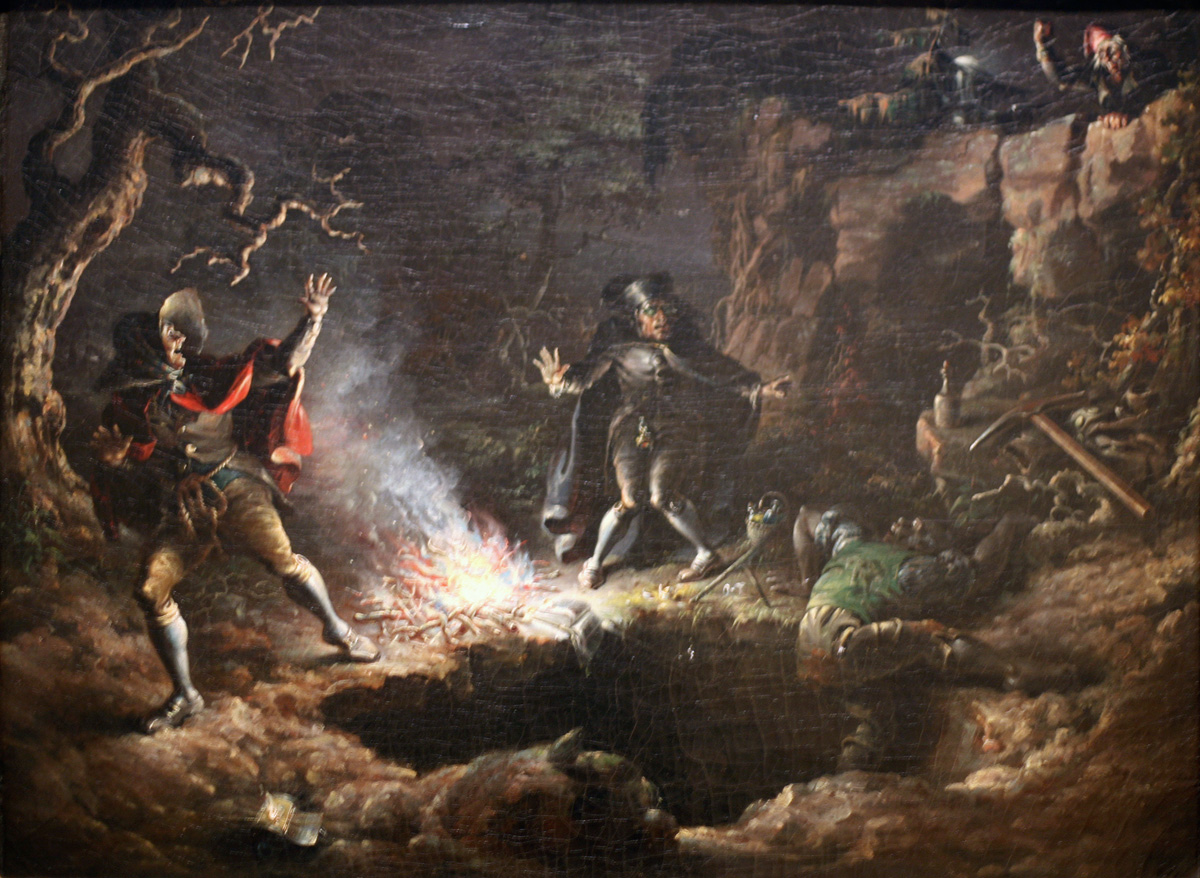
John Quidor. The Money Diggers, 1832. Oil on canvas. Brooklyn Museum

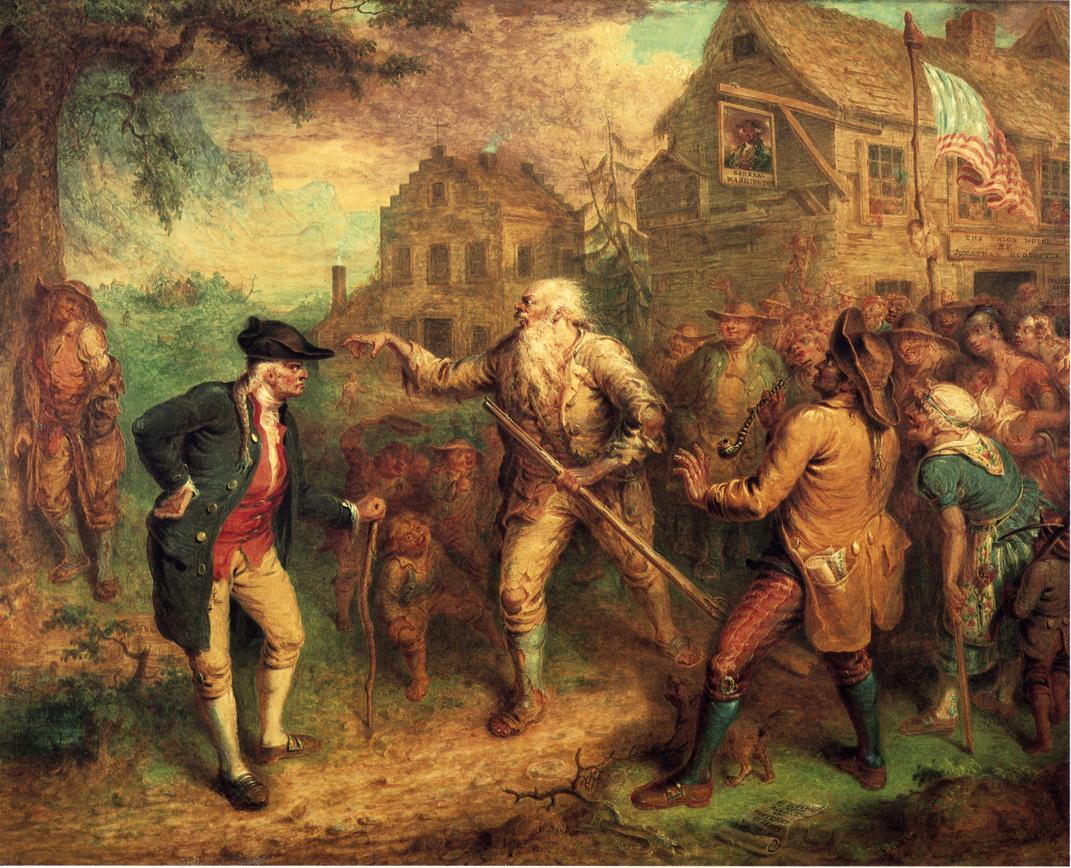
The Return of Rip Van Winkle (1849)

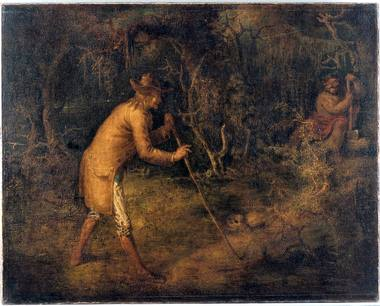
The Devil and Tom Walker (1856)

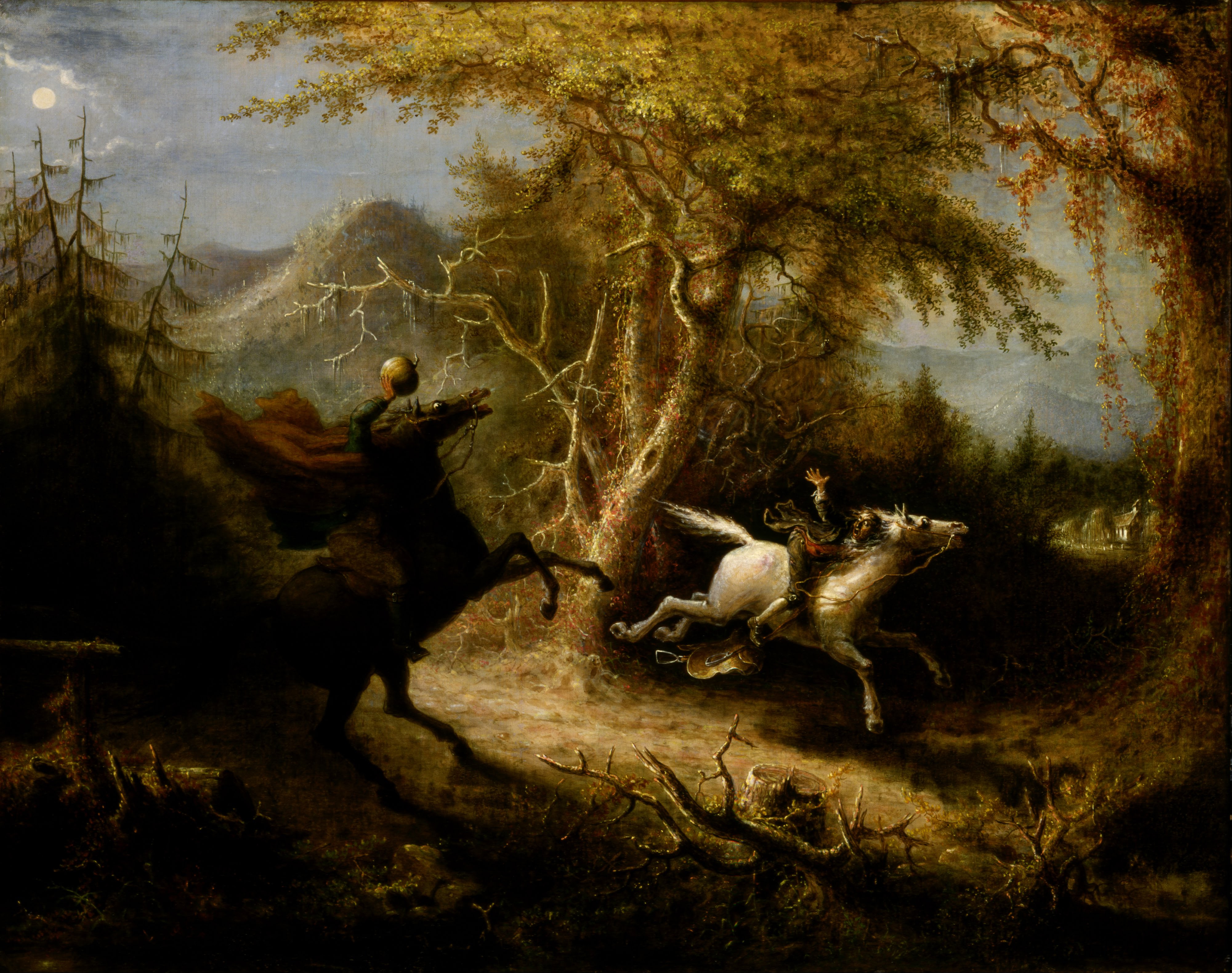
The Headless Horseman Pursuing Ichabod Crane (1858)
