= The Headless Horseman Pursuing Ichabod Crane =

1858 painting by John Quidor

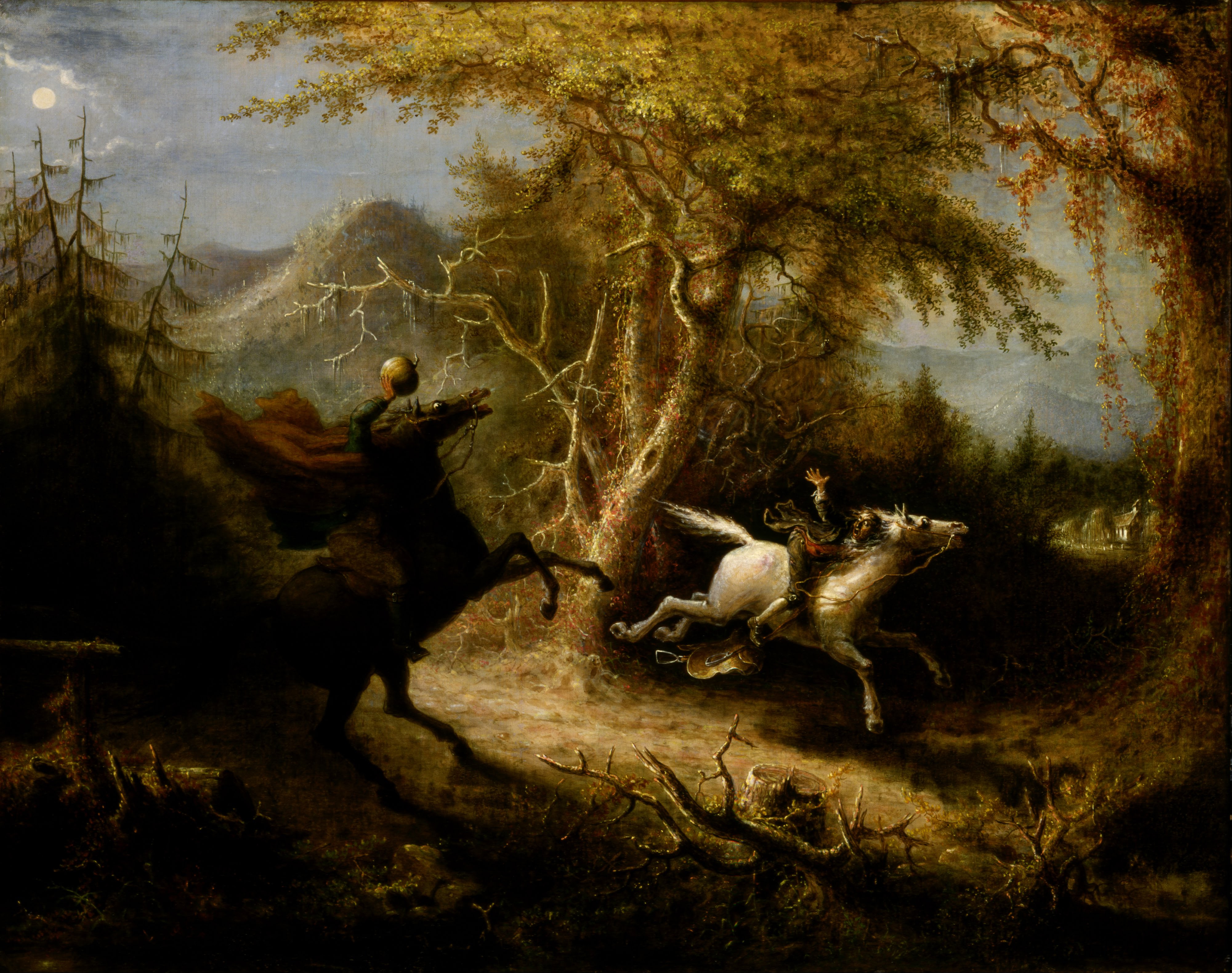
- Artist: John Quidor
- Year: 1858
- Medium: Oil on canvas
- Dimensions: 68.3 cm × 86 cm (26.9 in × 34 in)
- Location: Smithsonian American Art Museum, Washington, D.C.
- Accession: 1994.120

The Headless Horseman Pursuing Ichabod Crane is an oil on canvas painting by American artist John Quidor, from 1858. It depicts a scene from Washington Irving's 1820 short story The Legend of Sleepy Hollow.

== History and description ==
The schoolmaster Ichabod Crane is fleeing on a white horse, pursued by the Headless Horseman on a black horse. In one hand, the Headless Horseman is holding a pumpkin, which he is preparing to throw at Crane. Visible in the background is the Old Dutch Church of Sleepy Hollow and its churchyard, and the full moon.

The painting is one of several by the artist based on scenes from Irving's written works about Dutch New York, including such paintings as Ichabod Crane Flying from the Headless Horseman (1828, Yale University Art Gallery) and The Return of Rip Van Winkle (1849, National Gallery of Art).

Quidor first exhibited the picture at the National Academy of Design in New York City. The Smithsonian American Art Museum in Washington, D.C. bought the painting in 1994, but it was removed from display in 2021.
