= A History of the Life and Voyages of Christopher Columbus =

Book by Washington Irving

- Title page of Vol. I, UK first edition, 1828
- Author: Washington Irving
- Language: English
- Genre: Biography
- Publisher: John Murray (UK); G. & C. Carvill (US)
- Publication date: 1828
- Publication place: United States
- Media type: Print (Hardback)
- Preceded by: Tales of a Traveller
- Followed by: Chronicle of the Conquest of Granada

A History of the Life and Voyages of Christopher Columbus is a fictional biographical account of Christopher Columbus written by Washington Irving in 1828. It was published in four volumes in Britain and in three volumes in the United States. The work was the most popular treatment of Columbus in the English-speaking world until the publication of Samuel Eliot Morison's biography Admiral of the Ocean Sea in 1942. It is one of the first examples of American historical fiction and one of several attempts at nationalistic myth-making undertaken by American writers and poets of the 19th century. It also helped to perpetuate the myth that medieval people believed the Earth was flat.

== Writing ==
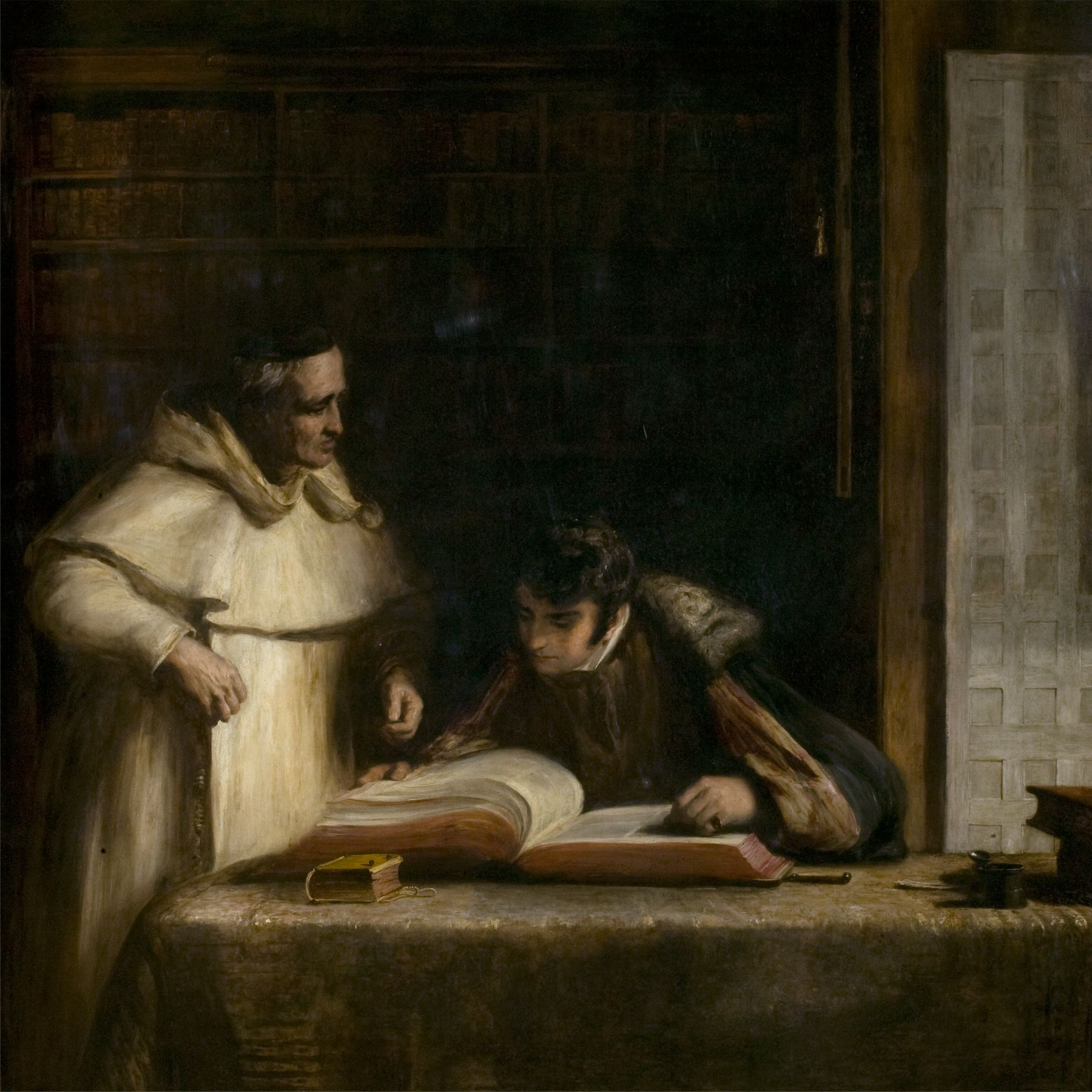
Washington Irving in the Archives of Seville by David Wilkie, 1828

Irving was invited to Madrid to translate Spanish-language source material on Columbus into English. Irving decided to use the sources to write his own four-volume biography and history. Irving was a fiction writer and employed his talent to create an hyperbolic story of Christopher Columbus.

During the research, he worked closely with Alexander von Humboldt, who had recently returned from his own North and South American trip, and could provide deep knowledge of the geography and science of the Americas and together they charted the route and first landing of Columbus in the Americas. Humboldt praised the biography after its release, which Walls, a biographer of Humboldt, partially attributes to Irving's willingness to pursue a wide-ranging scope of topics within the work, paralleling Humboldt's own effort, Examen Critique.

== Criticism ==
Historians have noted Irving's "active imagination" and called some aspects of his work "fanciful and sentimental". Literary critics have noted that Irving "saw American history as a useful means of establishing patriotism in his readers, and while his language tended to be more general, his avowed intention toward Columbus was thoroughly nationalist". From Irving's preface to the work, however, a contradictory intent emerges, that of the desire to write an accurate history: "In the execution of this work I have avoided indulging in mere speculations or general reflections, excepting such as rose naturally out of the subject, preferring to give a minute and circumstantial narrative, omitting no particular that appeared characteristic of the persons, the events, or the times; and endeavoring to place every fact in such a point of view, that the reader might perceive its merits, and draw his own maxims and conclusions" (I, 12-13). The critic William L. Hedges, in "Irving's Columbus: The Problem of Romantic Biography", argues: "To a large extent [Irving] may have been unconscious of his approach to history. And consciously he could not formulate his intentions except in stock phrases."

One glaring weakness, then, of the work as a historical biography, is perpetuating the myth that it was only the voyages of Columbus that finally convinced Europeans of his time that the Earth is not flat. In truth, no educated or influential member of medieval society believed the Earth to be flat. The idea of a spherical Earth had long been espoused in the classical tradition and was inherited by medieval academics. Irving had previously engaged in literary and historical hoaxes, and historian Jeffrey Burton Russell argues that Irving never intended to write a serious history of Columbus; rather, the superficial scholarliness of the work (including spurious footnotes) was a joke at the expense of his readers.

From the perspective of constructivist literary critique: "Most of the critics who react this way, however, attack the work with counterevidence that is already present in Irving's text. The problem with the biography, therefore, is not that Irving presented only a partial portrait but rather that, in his ambivalence about the character of his hero and the imperialism that established the American colonies, as well as in his confusion about the function of historical writing, he created two portraits of Columbus".
