= A Chronicle of the Conquest of Granada =

1829 non-fiction book

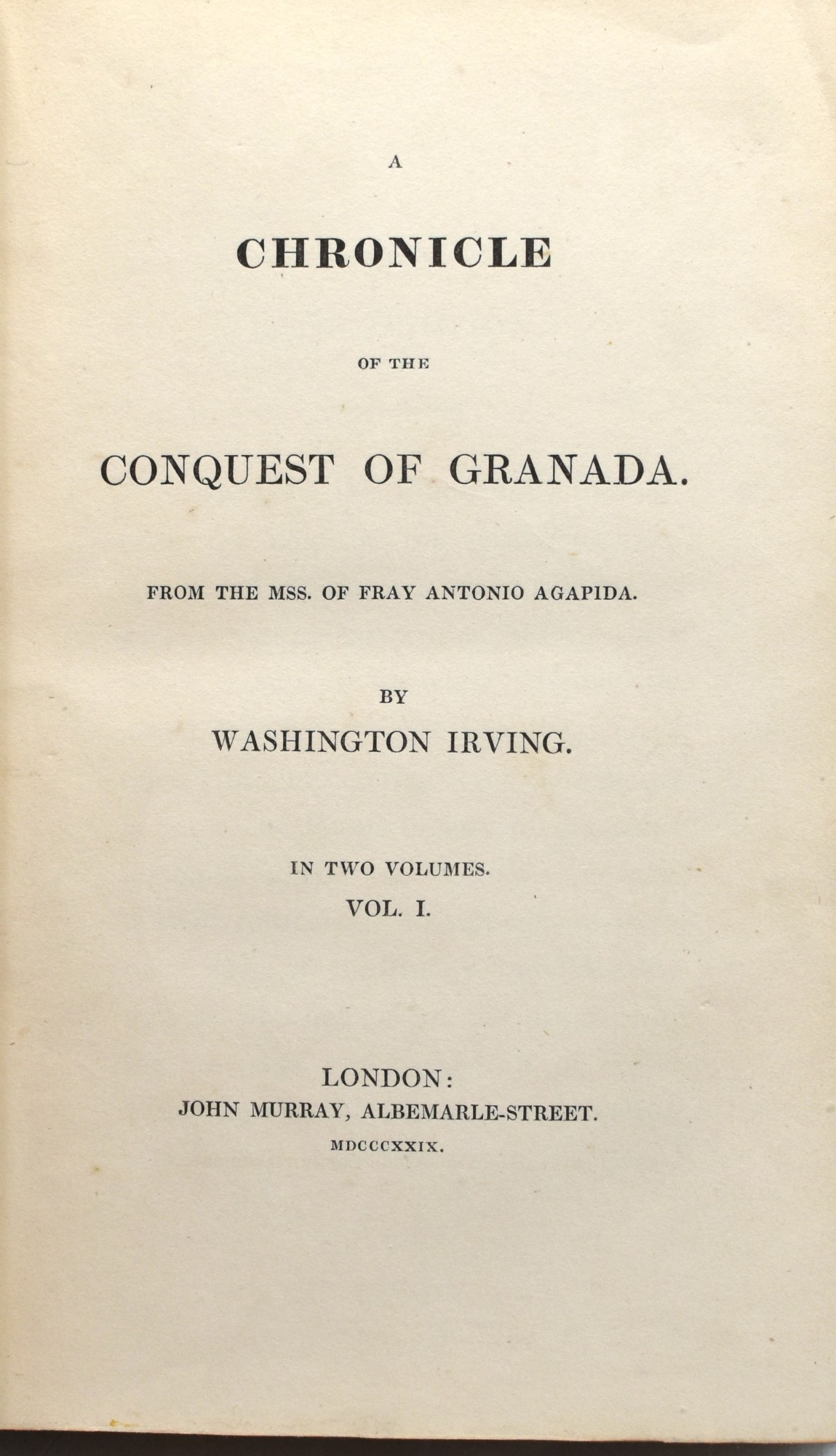
- Author: Washington Irving
- Language: English
- Genre: History
- Publisher: John Murray
- Publication date: 1829
- Publication place: United Kingdom
- Media type: Print

Chronicle of the Conquest of Granada is an 1829 history book by the American author Washington Irving. It charts the Granada War that completed the Reconquista of Spain in a romanticized manner. Originally the book was published in two volumes. Irving wrote it under the pen name of Fray Antonio Agapida, but his publisher John Murray added his real name to the title page. This irritated Irving as it had intended to portray it as a chronicle based on old Spanish historians, whereas "you make me personally responsible for the verity of fact and the soundness of the opinions of what was intended to given as a romantic chronicle".

In 1815 Irving had moved to London before travelling widely across Continental Europe. In Spain while researching the book he encountered the Scottish artist David Wilkie who depicted his researches in the 1828 painting Washington Irving in the Archives of Seville. It was a follow-up to Irving's successful A History of the Life and Voyages of Christopher Columbus.

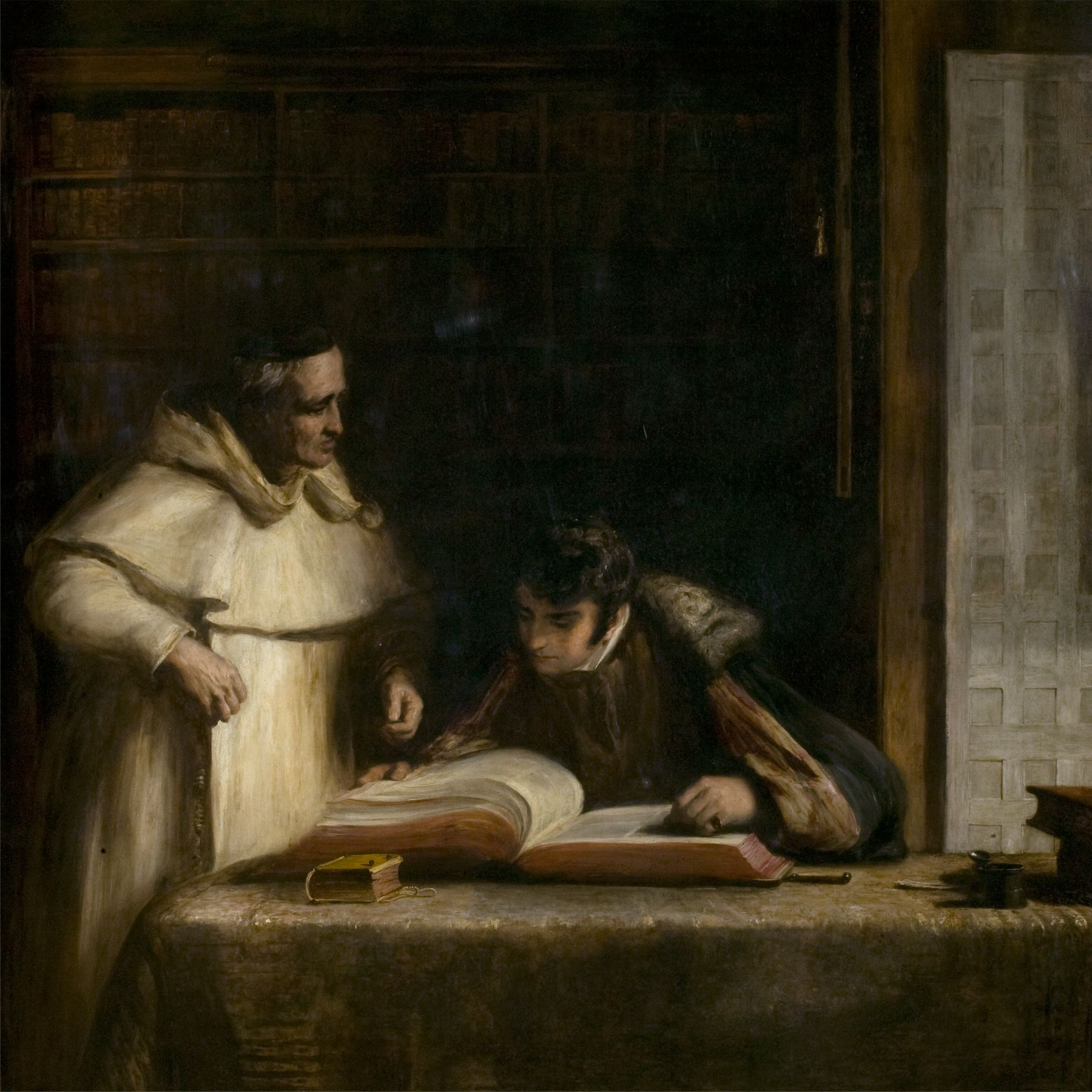
Washington Irving in the Archives of Seville by David Wilkie, 1828. Wilkie depicts Irving researching the book.

== Bibliography ==
- Macdonald, D. L. & McWhir, Anne (ed). The Broadview Anthology of Literature of the Revolutionary Period 1770-1832. Broadview Press, 2010.
- Tschachler, Heinz. Washington Irving and the Fantasy of Masculinity: Escaping the Woman Within. McFarland, 2022.
- Tromans, Nicholas. David Wilkie: The People's Painter. Edinburgh University Press, 2007.
