= William Coleman (editor) =

American journalist (1766–1829)

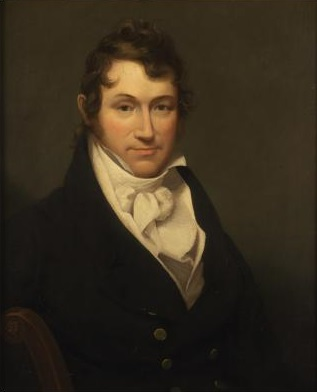
- An 1810 portrait of Coleman by William Dunlap, now housed with the New-York Historical Society
- Born: February 14, 1766; Boston, Province of Massachusetts Bay, British America
- Died: July 13, 1829 (aged 63); New York City, U.S.
- Occupation: Newspaper editor

William Coleman (February 14, 1766 – July 13, 1829) was the first editor of The New York Evening Post, which is now the New York Post. He was chosen for the position by Alexander Hamilton, who founded the newspaper in 1801.

== Early life and education ==
Coleman was born in Boston, on February 14, 1766. He studied law with Joshua Atherton of Amherst, New Hampshire, where his fellow students included William Plumer, who remained a lifelong friend.

== Career ==
Coleman was admitted to the bar, and moved to Greenfield, Massachusetts, where he became the town's first lawyer and co-founder of the Impartial Intelligencer newspaper, now known as The Greenfield Recorder. He moved to New York City around 1794 and practiced law at one point with Aaron Burr.

=== New York Evening Post editor ===
In 1801, Alexander Hamilton, founder of The New York Evening Post, appointed Coleman as the newspaper's first editor, and he served in this capacity until 1829.

==== Duel with Jeremiah Thompson ====
In early 1804, Coleman killed New York City harbormaster Captain Jeremiah Thompson in a duel. The duel took place at "Love Lane", the path of which is now 21st Street in Manhattan between Sixth and Eighth Avenues.

The duel arose from a dispute between Coleman and James Cheetham, editor of the rival New York City newspaper, American Citizen. When Cheetham claimed that Coleman was the father of a mulatto child, Coleman challenged Cheetham to a duel. The duel did not occur, however, because others intervened to stop it including Judge Brockholst Livingston. Thompson, a friend of Cheetham, claimed that the duel had only been stopped because Coleman had revealed it publicly before it had occurred, because he was a coward.

Coleman then challenged Thompson to a duel. On the appointed evening it was quite dark, and the parties reportedly had to approach a few steps closer after taking initial shots, in order to see each other. At that point, Thompson was shot and was claimed to have exclaimed "I've got it" as he fell into the snow. A physician who had been brought to the scene confirmed it was a mortal wound, and Thompson was left at the entrance of his sister's residence, and those involved rang the bell and quickly left. Thompson refused to reveal Coleman's name or any other details, and simply said that he had been treated fairly. The details of the duel were not revealed for many years. After the event, however, Cheetham was more careful in his editorial treatment of Coleman.

Later the same year, Coleman's friend Alexander Hamilton was killed by Aaron Burr in perhaps the most famous duel in U.S. history. After Hamilton's death, Coleman compiled a book of materials regarding the duel and Hamilton's death.

In 1815, Coleman was elected a member of the American Antiquarian Society.

==== Attacked by state official ====
In 1819, after publishing a highly negative story about prominent state official and Democrat Henry B. Hagerman, Coleman was viciously attacked by Hagerman and left bleeding in the street. It took many weeks for Coleman to recover from the beating, and he suffered from bouts of paralysis for the remainder of his life. Coleman later recovered $4,000 in a civil suit against Hagerman, considered a large award for the time.

== Death ==
On July 13, 1829, while still serving as editor of the New York Evening Post, Coleman died of a stroke in New York City, at age 63. He was succeeded at the Post by William Cullen Bryant.
