= Beggar My Neighbour (play) =

1802 play

- Original language: English
- Written by: Thomas Morton
- Genre: Comedy
- Setting: England, present day

Premiere
- Date: 10 July 1802
- Place: Theatre Royal, Haymarket, London

Beggar My Neighbour is an 1802 comedy play by the British author Thomas Morton. It premiered in London at the Theatre Royal, Haymarket, then under the management of George Colman, on 10 July 1802. It received a poor reception from audiences.

== Bibliography ==
- Greene, John C. Theatre in Dublin, 1745-1820: A Calendar of Performances, Volume 6. Lexington Books, 2011.
- Macqueen-Pope, Walter. Haymarket: Theatre of Perfection. W.H. Allen, 1948.
- Nicoll, Allardyce. A History of English Drama 1660–1900: Volume IV. Cambridge University Press, 2009.
