= A History of New York =

1809 book by Washington Irving

A History of New York, From the Beginning of the World to the End of the Dutch Dynasty
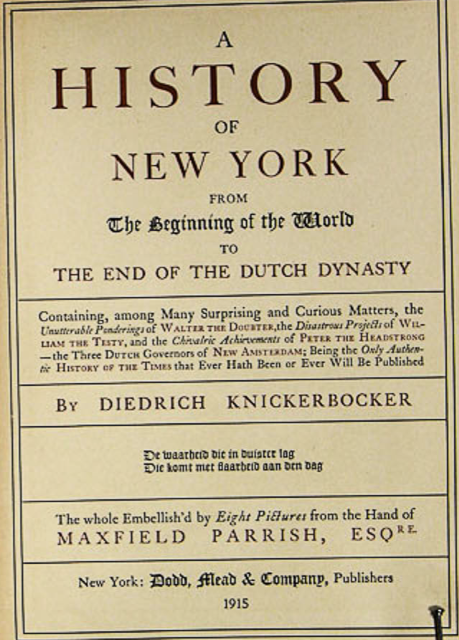
- Title page for the 1915 edition
- Author: Washington Irving
- Language: English
- Subject: History of New York City
- Genre: Satire
- Publisher: various
- Publication date: December 6th, 1809
- Publication place: United States

A History of New York, subtitled From the Beginning of the World to the End of the Dutch Dynasty, is an 1809 literary parody on the early history of New York City by Washington Irving. Originally published under the pseudonym Diedrich Knickerbocker, later editions that acknowledged Irving's authorship were printed as Knickerbocker's History of New York.

The book is significant as early media describing what became modern Christmas traditions in the United States.

== Background ==
Irving had previously published his compilation of sketches Letters of Jonathan Oldstyle, Gent. (1802) and headed a short-lived periodical called Salmagundi (1807–1808). He completed his satirical A History of New York in 1809 after the death of his 17-year-old fiancée Matilda Hoffman. It was his first major book and a satire on local history and contemporary politics. Before its publication, Irving started a hoax by placing a series of missing person advertisements in New York newspapers seeking information on Diedrich Knickerbocker, a Dutch historian who had allegedly gone missing from his hotel in New York City. As part of this guerrilla marketing ruse he placed a notice from the hotel's proprietor informing readers that if Mr. Knickerbocker failed to return to the hotel to pay his bill he would publish a manuscript that Knickerbocker had left behind.

Unsuspecting readers followed the story of Knickerbocker and his manuscript with interest, and some New York city officials were concerned enough about the missing historian to offer a reward for his safe return. Irving then published A History of New York on December 6, 1809, under the Knickerbocker pseudonym, with immediate critical and popular success. "It took with the public", Irving remarked, "and gave me celebrity, as an original work was something remarkable and uncommon in America". The name Diedrich Knickerbocker became a nickname for Manhattan residents in general and was adopted by the New York Knickerbockers basketball team.

== Reception ==
Contemporary critics of the book described it as "an attempt to annihilate the history of America". John Neal, in his critical work American Writers (1824–25), offered a mixed review:

In a word, we look upon this volume of Knickerbocker; though it is tiresome, though there are some wretched failures in it; a little overdoing of the humorous—and a little confusion of purpose, throughout—as a work, honourable to English literature—namely—bold—and so altogether original, without being extravagant, as to stand alone, among the labors of men.

Stanley Thomas Williams and Tremaine McDowell, editors of the 1927 edition of A History of New York, called this the most intelligent review of the book since its release in 1809.

The book loosely inspired the musical Knickerbocker Holiday.

In 2005, reviewer Christine Wade described the book as satire and not being a modern novel.

In the introduction to the 2008 edition, Elizabeth L. Bradley argues that the work is an unconventional novel; she notes that early readers were reminded of Sterne's Tristram Shandy, and that "the proto-postmodern innovations of the History" resemble "the same inventive qualities in such subsequent American writers as Nathaniel Hawthorne, Herman Melville, Thomas Pynchon, and Don DeLillo".

In 2012, reviewer Jerome McGann said that, despite the book being satire, it also contains useful historical facts and context.
