= American Citizen (newspaper) =

American Citizen was an influential newspaper in New York City in the early 19th century. The newspaper opposed Aaron Burr's 1804 candidacy for governor of New York.

The paper started in 1800 as the American citizen and general daily advertiser, though it was effectively a continuation of Greenleaf's New Daily Advertiser (1796–1800) and The Argus, or, Greenleaf's New Daily Adverstiser (1795–96).

The title was shortened to American Citizen in 1802. James Cheetham was the leading editor of the paper, first becoming involved in 1801, and becoming appointed publisher by April 1803. Cheetham was frequently sued for libel, although many of the suits ended in mistrial, dismissal, or deadlock.

The paper ceased publication a few months after Cheetham's death.
