= Washington Irving =

American writer, historian and diplomat (1783–1859)

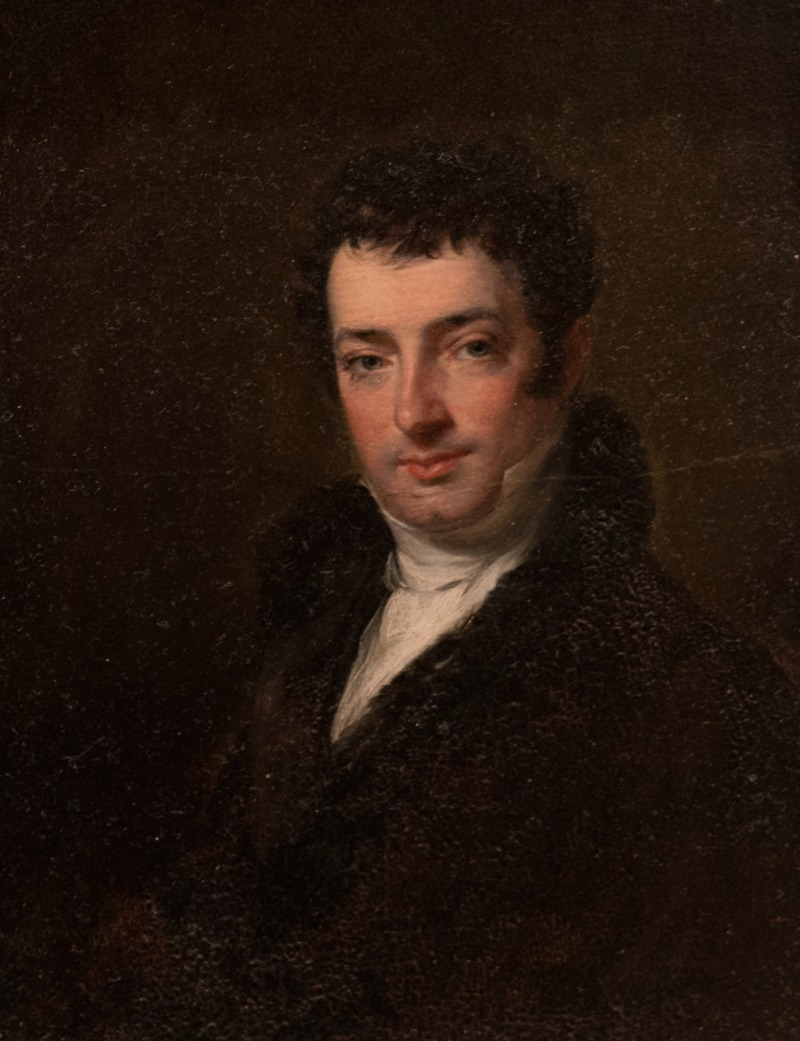
- Portrait attributed to Charles Robert Leslie, c. 1820
- Born: April 3, 1783; Manhattan, New York, New York, U.S.
- Died: November 28, 1859 (aged 76); Tarrytown, New York, U.S.
- Resting place: Sleepy Hollow Cemetery, New York, U.S.
- Occupations: Short story writer; essayist; biographer; historian; diplomat
- Relatives: William Irving (brother); Peter Irving (brother)
- Writing career
- Pen name: Geoffrey Crayon, Diedrich Knickerbocker, Jonathan Oldstyle
- Language: English
- Movement: Romanticism

10th United States Minister to Spain
- In office August 1, 1842 – July 29, 1846
- President: John Tyler; James K. Polk
- Preceded by: John H. Eaton
- Succeeded by: Romulus M. Saunders

Washington Irving (April 3, 1783 – November 28, 1859) was an American writer, essayist, biographer, historian, and diplomat of the early 19th century. He wrote the short stories "Rip Van Winkle" (1819) and "The Legend of Sleepy Hollow" (1820), both of which appear in his collection The Sketch Book of Geoffrey Crayon, Gent. His historical works include biographies of the writer Oliver Goldsmith, Islamic prophet Muhammad, and president George Washington, as well as several histories of 15th-century Spain that deal with topics such as the Alhambra palace, the arrival of Europeans in the Americas and Christopher Columbus, and the Reconquista. Irving served as the American ambassador to Spain in the 1840s.

Irving was born and raised in Manhattan to a merchant family. He made his literary debut in 1802 with a series of observational letters to the Morning Chronicle, written under the pseudonym Jonathan Oldstyle. He temporarily moved to England for the family business in 1815, where he achieved fame with the publication of The Sketch Book of Geoffrey Crayon, Gent. which was serialized from 1819 to 1820. He continued to publish regularly throughout his life, and he completed a five-volume biography of George Washington just eight months before his death at age 76 in Tarrytown, New York.

Irving was one of the first American writers to earn acclaim in Europe, and he encouraged other American authors such as Henry Wadsworth Longfellow and Edgar Allan Poe. He was also admired by British authors Francis Jeffrey and Walter Scott. He advocated for writing as a legitimate profession and argued for stronger laws to protect American writers from copyright infringement.

== Biography ==
=== Early years ===
According to holograph notes by Pierre Munroe Irving, Washington Irving's nephew and literary assistant, the family's lineage goes back to Clan Irvine of Drum Castle in Scotland, UK. The notes include a traditional family story regarding the coat of arms, which features three holly leaves; it was reportedly granted by Robert the Bruce to his armor-bearer, William de Irwyn, as a mark of loyalty. Washington Irving was proud of his Scottish (British) heritage and used the holly leaf imagery as a personal emblem.

Washington Irving's parents were William Irving Sr., originally of Quholm, Shapinsay, Orkney, Scotland, and Sarah (née Saunders), originally of Falmouth, Cornwall, England. They married in 1761 while William was serving as a petty officer in the British Royal Navy. They had eleven children, eight of whom survived to adulthood. Their first two sons died in infancy, both named William, as did their fourth child John. Their surviving children were William Jr. (1766), Ann (1770), Peter (1771), Catherine (1774), Ebenezer (1776), John Treat (1778), Sarah (1780), and Washington.

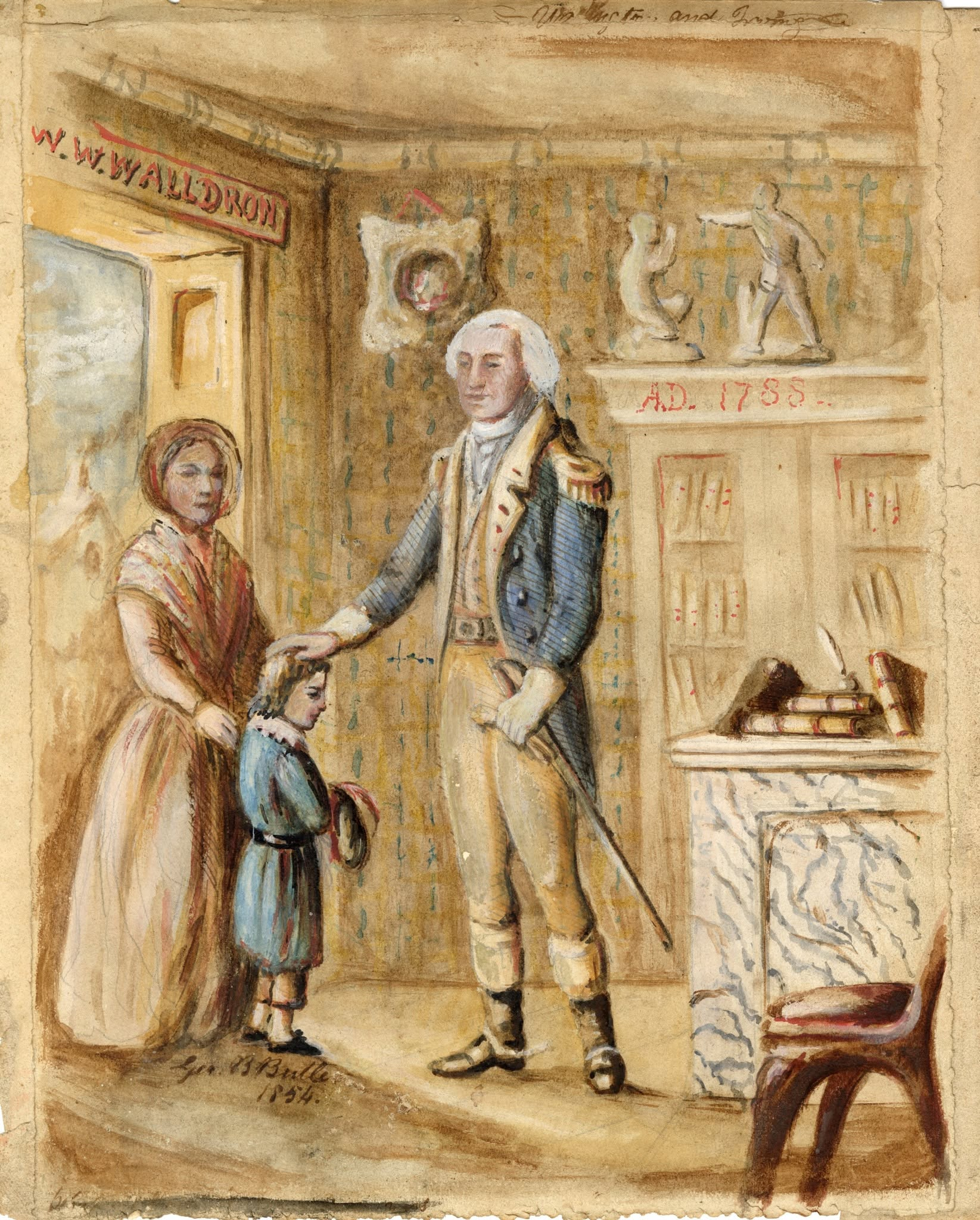
Watercolor of Washington Irving's encounter with George Washington, painted in 1854 by George Bernard Butler Jr.

The Irving family settled in Manhattan, and were part of the city's merchant class. Washington was born on April 3, 1783, the same week that New York City residents learned of the Treaty of Paris which ended the American Revolutionary War. Irving's mother named him after George Washington. Irving met his namesake at age 6 when George Washington came to New York just before his inauguration as president in 1789. The first President blessed young Irving, an encounter that Irving had commemorated in a small watercolor painting which continues to hang in his home.

The Irvings lived at 131 William Street at the time of Washington's birth, but they later moved across the street to 128 William Street. Several of Irving's brothers became active New York merchants; they encouraged his literary aspirations, often supporting him financially as he pursued his writing career.

Irving was an uninterested student who preferred adventure stories and drama, and he regularly sneaked out of class in the evenings to attend the theater by the time he was 14. An outbreak of yellow fever in Manhattan in 1798 prompted his family to send him upriver, where he stayed with his friend James Kirke Paulding in Tarrytown, New York. It was in Tarrytown where he became familiar with the bucolic beauty of the region, with its Dutch customs and local ghost stories. Though the village of Sleepy Hollow did not exist in Irving's time (North Tarrytown would change its name to Sleepy Hollow in 1996), the area which Irving would make famous in "The Legend of Sleepy Hollow" had been known as Slapershaven or "Sleeper's Haven" by the Dutch settlers. Irving made several other trips up the Hudson as a teenager, including an extended visit to Johnstown, New York, where he passed through the Catskill Mountains region, the setting for "Rip Van Winkle". "Of all the scenery of the Hudson", Irving wrote, "the Kaatskill Mountains had the most witching effect on my boyish imagination".

Irving began writing letters to the New York Morning Chronicle (a newspaper edited by his brother Peter) in 1802 when he was 19, submitting commentaries on the city's social and theater scene under the pseudonym Jonathan Oldstyle. The name evoked his Federalist leanings and was the first of many pseudonyms he employed throughout his career. The letters brought Irving some early fame and moderate notoriety. Aaron Burr was the founder of the Chronicle and was impressed enough to send clippings of the Oldstyle pieces to his daughter Theodosia. (In 1807, Irving would cover the Burr trial for the newspaper.) Charles Brockden Brown made a trip to New York to try to recruit Oldstyle for a literary magazine he was editing in Philadelphia.

Concerned for his health, Irving's brothers financed an extended tour of Europe from 1804 to 1806. He bypassed most of the sites and locations considered essential for the social development of a young man, to the dismay of his brother William who wrote that he was pleased that his brother's health was improving, but he did not like the choice to "gallop through Italy ... leaving Florence on your left and Venice on your right". Instead, Irving honed the social and conversational skills that eventually made him one of the world's most in-demand guests. "I endeavor to take things as they come with cheerfulness", Irving wrote, "and when I cannot get a dinner to suit my taste, I endeavor to get a taste to suit my dinner". While visiting Rome in 1805, Irving struck up a friendship with painter Washington Allston and was almost persuaded into a career as a painter. "My lot in life, however, was differently cast".

=== First major writings ===
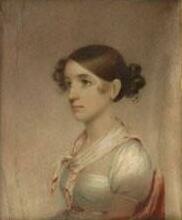
Matilda Hoffman, portrait by Anson Dickinson

Irving returned from Europe to study law with his legal mentor Judge Josiah Ogden Hoffman in New York City. By his own admission, he was not a good student and barely passed the bar examination in 1806. He began socializing with a group of literate young men whom he dubbed "The Lads of Kilkenny", and he created the literary magazine Salmagundi in January 1807 with his brother William and his friend James Kirke Paulding, writing under various pseudonyms, such as William Wizard and Launcelot Langstaff. Irving lampooned New York culture and politics in a manner similar to the 20th century Mad magazine. Salmagundi was a moderate success, spreading Irving's name and reputation beyond New York. He gave New York City the nickname "Gotham" in its 17th issue dated November 11, 1807, an Anglo-Saxon word meaning "Goat's Town".

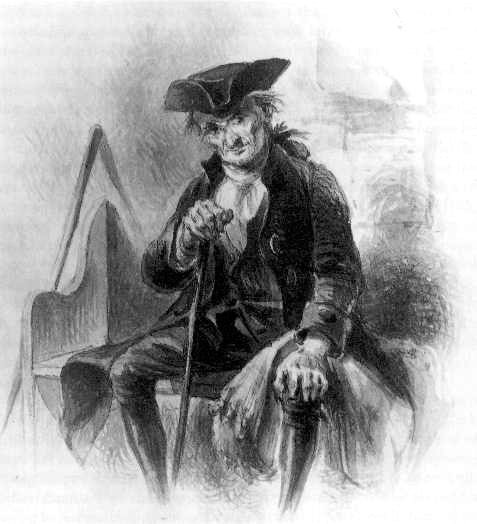
The fictional "Diedrich Knickerbocker" from the frontispiece of A History of New York, a wash drawing by Felix O. C. Darley

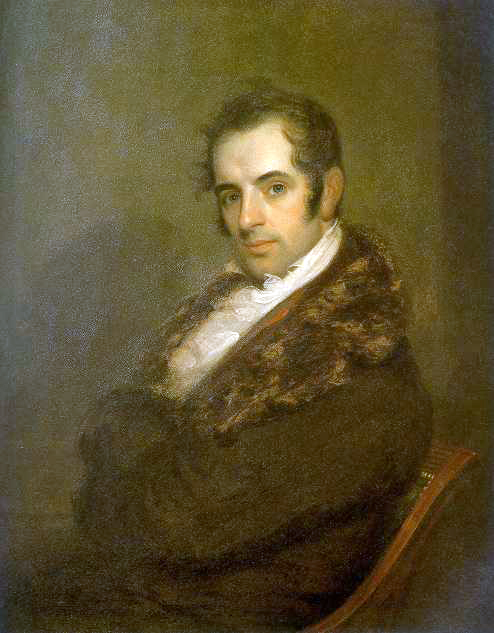
Portrait of Washington Irving in 1809 at about 26 years old, by John Wesley Jarvis

Irving completed A History of New-York from the Beginning of the World to the End of the Dutch Dynasty, by Diedrich Knickerbocker (1809) while mourning the death of his 17-year-old fiancée Matilda Hoffman. It was his first major book and a satire on self-important local history and contemporary politics. Before its publication, Irving started a hoax by placing a series of missing person advertisements in the New York Evening Post seeking information on Diedrich Knickerbocker, a crusty Dutch historian who had allegedly gone missing from his hotel in New York City. As part of the ruse, he placed a notice from the hotel's proprietor informing readers that, if Mr. Knickerbocker failed to return to the hotel to pay his bill, he would publish a manuscript that Knickerbocker had left behind.

Unsuspecting readers followed the story of Knickerbocker and his manuscript with interest, and some New York city officials were concerned enough about the missing historian to offer a reward for his safe return. Irving then published A History of New York on December 6, 1809, under the Knickerbocker pseudonym, with immediate critical and popular success. "It took with the public", Irving remarked, "and gave me celebrity, as an original work was something remarkable and uncommon in America". The name Knickerbocker became a nickname for Manhattan residents in general and was adopted by the New York Knickerbockers basketball team.

After the success of A History of New York, Irving searched for a job and eventually became an editor of Analectic Magazine, where he wrote biographies of naval heroes such as James Lawrence and Oliver Hazard Perry. He was also among the first magazine editors to reprint Francis Scott Key's poem "Defense of Fort McHenry", which was immortalized as "The Star-Spangled Banner". Irving initially opposed the War of 1812 like many other merchants, but the British burning of Washington in 1814 convinced him to enlist. He served on the staff of Daniel D. Tompkins, governor of New York and commander of the New York State Militia, but he saw no real action apart from a reconnaissance mission in the Great Lakes region. The war was disastrous for many American merchants, including Irving's family, and he left for England in mid-1815 to salvage the family trading company. He remained in Europe for the next 17 years.

=== Life in Europe ===
==== The Sketch Book ====
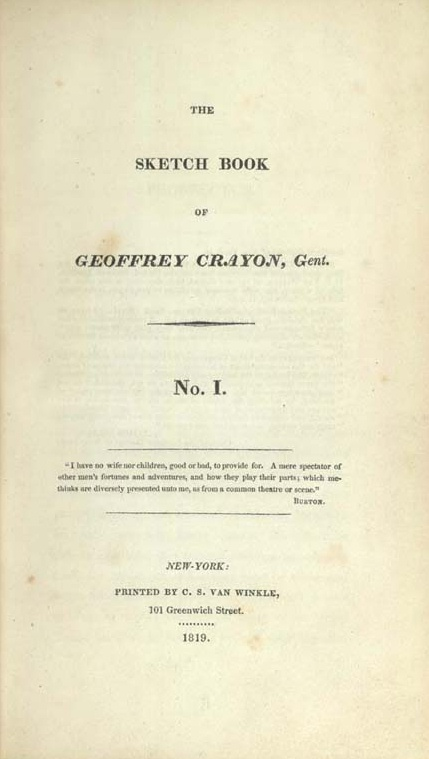
The front page of The Sketch Book (1819)

Irving spent the next two years trying to bail out the family firm financially but eventually had to declare bankruptcy. With no job prospects, he continued writing throughout 1817 and 1818. In the summer of 1817, he visited Walter Scott, beginning a lifelong personal and professional friendship. Irving composed the short story "Rip Van Winkle" overnight while staying with his sister Sarah and her husband, Henry van Wart, in Birmingham, England, a place that inspired other works as well. In October 1818, Irving's brother William secured for Irving a post as chief clerk to the United States Navy and urged him to return home. Irving turned the offer down, opting to stay in England to pursue a writing career.

In the spring of 1819, Irving sent to his brother Ebenezer in New York a set of short prose pieces that he asked be published as The Sketch Book of Geoffrey Crayon, Gent. The first installment, containing "Rip Van Winkle", was an enormous success, and the rest of the work was equally successful; it was issued in 1819–1820 in seven installments in New York and in two volumes in London ("The Legend of Sleepy Hollow" appeared in the sixth issue of the New York edition and the second volume of the London edition). Like many successful authors of this era, Irving struggled against literary bootleggers. In England, some of his sketches were reprinted in periodicals without his permission, a legal practice as there was no international copyright law at the time. To prevent further such reprints in Britain, Irving paid to have the first four American installments published as a single volume by John Miller in London.

Irving appealed to Walter Scott for help procuring a more reputable publisher for the remainder of the book. Scott referred Irving to his own publisher, London powerhouse John Murray, who agreed to take on The Sketch Book. From then on, Irving would publish concurrently in the United States and Britain to protect his copyright, with Murray as his English publisher of choice. Irving's reputation soared, and for the next two years, he led an active social life in Paris and Great Britain, where he was often feted as an anomaly of literature: an upstart American who dared to write English well.

==== Bracebridge Hall and Tales of a Traveller ====
With both Irving and publisher John Murray eager to follow up on the success of The Sketch Book, Irving spent much of 1821 traveling in Europe in search of new material, reading widely in Dutch and German folk tales. Hampered by writer's block—and depressed by the death of his brother William—Irving worked slowly, finally delivering a completed manuscript to Murray in March 1822. The book, Bracebridge Hall, or The Humorists, A Medley (the location was based loosely on Aston Hall, occupied by members of the Bracebridge family, near his sister's home in Birmingham) was published in June 1822.

The format of Bracebridge was similar to that of The Sketch Book, with Irving, as Crayon, narrating a series of more than 50 loosely connected short stories and essays. While some reviewers thought Bracebridge to be a lesser imitation of The Sketch Book, the book was well received by readers and critics. "We have received so much pleasure from this book", wrote critic Francis Jeffrey in the Edinburgh Review, "that we think ourselves bound in gratitude ... to make a public acknowledgement of it". Irving was relieved at its reception, which did much to cement his reputation with European readers.

Still struggling with writer's block, Irving traveled to Germany, settling in Dresden in the winter of 1822. Here he dazzled the royal family and attached himself to Amelia Foster, an American living in Dresden with her five children. The 39-year-old Irving was particularly attracted to Foster's 18-year-old daughter Emily and vied in frustration for her hand. Emily finally refused his offer of marriage in the spring of 1823.

He returned to Paris and began collaborating with playwright John Howard Payne on translations of French plays for the English stage, with little success. He also learned through Payne that the novelist Mary Wollstonecraft Shelley was romantically interested in him, though Irving never pursued the relationship.

In August 1824, Irving published the collection of essays Tales of a Traveller—including the short story "The Devil and Tom Walker"—under his Geoffrey Crayon persona. "I think there are in it some of the best things I have ever written", Irving told his sister. But while the book sold respectably, Traveller was dismissed by critics, who panned both Traveller and its author. "The public have been led to expect better things", wrote the United States Literary Gazette, while the New-York Mirror pronounced Irving "overrated". Hurt and depressed by the book's reception, Irving retreated to Paris where he spent the next year worrying about finances and scribbling down ideas for projects that never materialized.

==== Spanish books ====
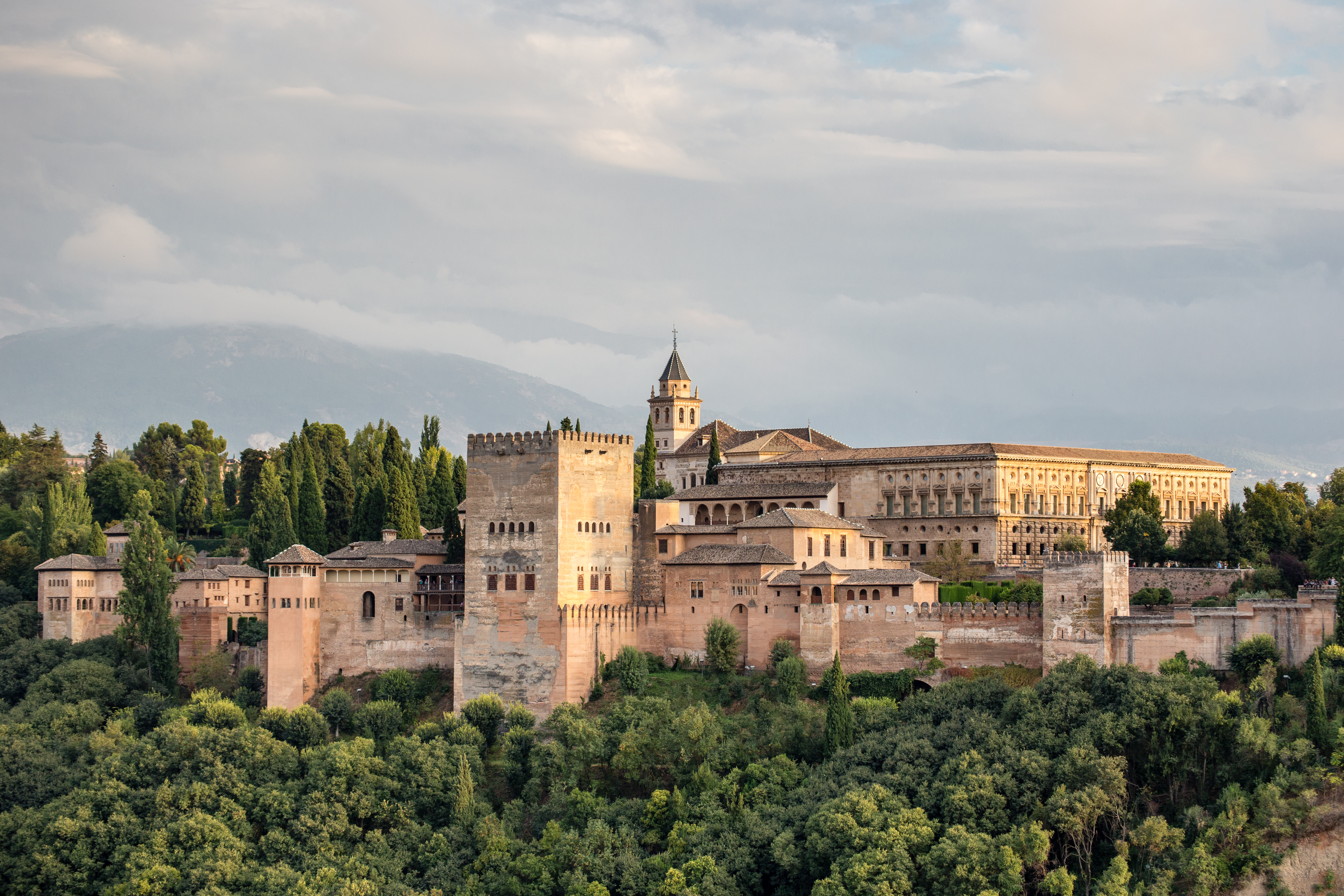
The Alhambra palace in Granada, southern Spain, where Irving briefly resided in 1829, inspired one of his most colorful books.

While in Paris, Irving received a letter from Alexander Hill Everett on January 30, 1826. Everett, recently the American Minister to Spain, urged Irving to join him in Madrid, noting that a number of manuscripts dealing with the Spanish conquest of the Americas had recently been made public. Irving left for Madrid and enthusiastically began scouring the Spanish archives for colorful material.

With full access to the American consul's massive library of Spanish history, Irving began working on several books at once. The first offspring of this hard work, A History of the Life and Voyages of Christopher Columbus, was published in January 1828. The book was popular in the United States and in Europe and would have 175 editions published before the end of the century. It was also the first project of Irving's to be published with his own name, instead of a pseudonym, on the title page. Irving was invited to stay at the palace of the Duke of Gor, who gave him unfettered access to his library containing many medieval manuscripts. A Chronicle of the Conquest of Granada was published a year later, followed by Voyages and Discoveries of the Companions of Columbus in 1831.

Irving's writings on Columbus are a mixture of history and fiction, a genre now called romantic history. Irving based them on extensive research in the Spanish archives, but also added imaginative elements aimed at sharpening the story. The first of these works is the source of the durable myth that medieval Europeans believed the Earth was flat. According to the popular book, Columbus proved the Earth was round.

In 1829, Irving was elected to the American Philosophical Society. That same year, he moved into Granada's ancient palace Alhambra, "determined to linger here", he said, "until I get some writings under way connected with the place". Before he could get any significant writing underway, however, he was notified of his appointment as Secretary to the American Legation in London. Worried he would disappoint friends and family if he refused the position, Irving left Spain for England in July 1829.

==== Secretary to the American legation in London ====
Arriving in London, Irving joined the staff of the American ambassador to Britain, Louis McLane. McLane immediately assigned the daily secretary work to another man and tapped Irving to be his personal assistant. The two worked over the next year to negotiate a trade agreement between the United States and the British West Indies, finally reaching a deal in August 1830. That same year, Irving was awarded a medal by the Royal Society of Literature, followed by an honorary doctorate of civil law from Oxford in 1831.

Following McLane's recall to the United States in 1831 to serve as Secretary of Treasury, Irving stayed on as the legation's chargé d'affaires until the arrival of Martin Van Buren, President Andrew Jackson's nominee for ambassador to Britain. With Van Buren in place, Irving resigned his post to concentrate on writing, eventually completing Tales of the Alhambra, which would be published concurrently in the United States and England in 1832.

Irving was still in London when Van Buren received word that the United States Senate had refused to confirm him as the new Minister. Consoling Van Buren, Irving predicted that the Senate's partisan move would backfire. "I should not be surprised", Irving said, "if this vote of the Senate goes far toward elevating him to the presidential chair".

=== Return to the United States ===
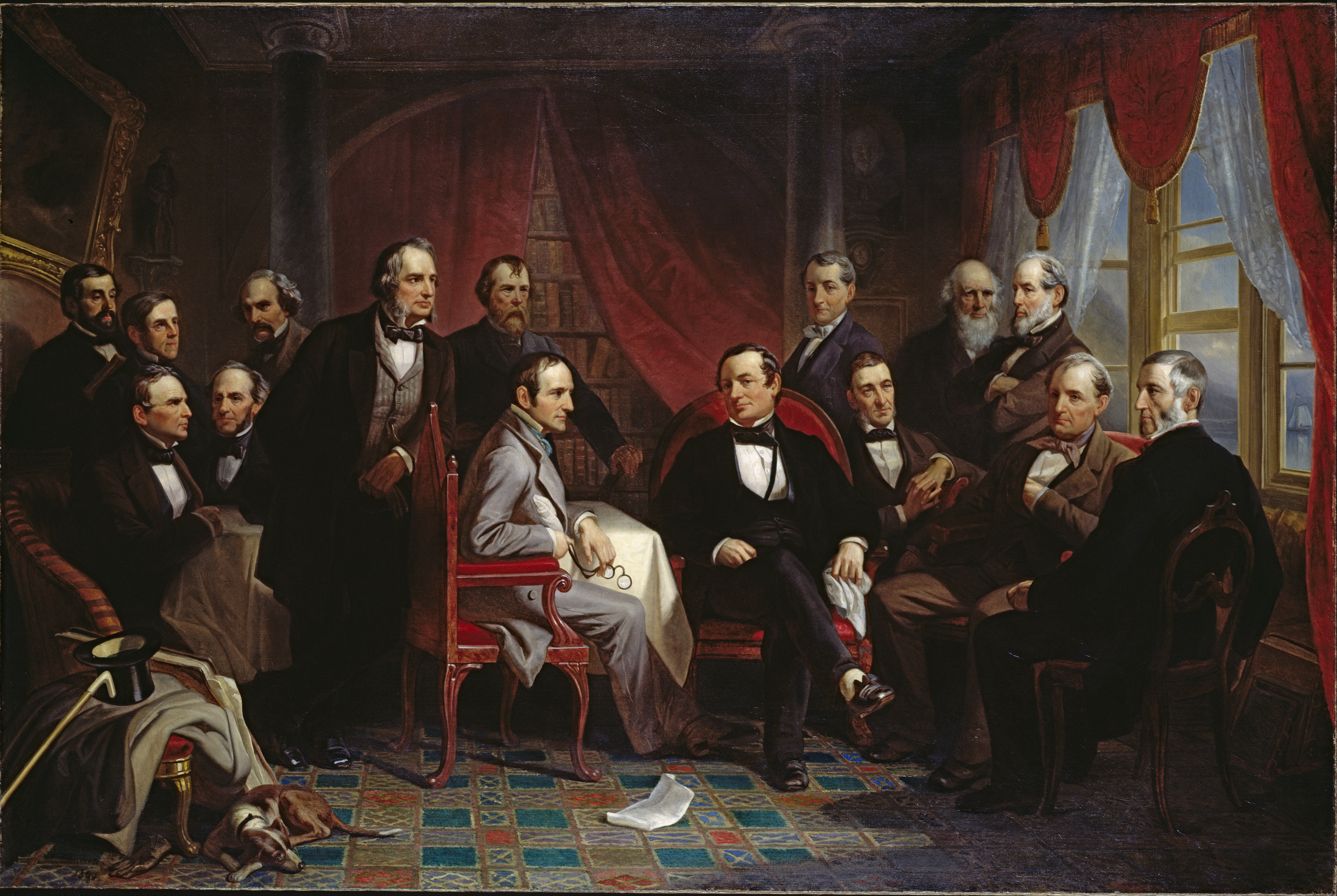
Irving and his friends at Sunnyside

Irving arrived in New York on May 21, 1832, after 17 years abroad. That September, he accompanied Commissioner on Indian Affairs Henry Leavitt Ellsworth on a surveying mission, along with companions Charles La Trobe and Count Albert-Alexandre de Pourtales, and they traveled deep into Indian Territory (now the state of Oklahoma). At the completion of his western tour, Irving traveled through Washington, D.C., and Baltimore, where he became acquainted with politician and novelist John Pendleton Kennedy.

Irving was frustrated by bad investments, so he turned to writing to generate additional income, beginning with A Tour on the Prairies which related his recent travels on the frontier. The book was another popular success and also the first book written and published by Irving in the United States since A History of New York in 1809. In 1834, he was approached by fur magnate John Jacob Astor, who convinced him to write a history of his fur trading colony in Astoria, Oregon. Irving made quick work of Astor's project, shipping the fawning biographical account Astoria in February 1836. In 1835, Irving, Astor, and a few others founded the Saint Nicholas Society in the City of New York.

During an extended stay at Astor's home, Irving met explorer Benjamin Bonneville and was intrigued with his maps and stories of the territories beyond the Rocky Mountains. The two men met in Washington, D.C., several months later, and Bonneville sold his maps and rough notes to Irving for $1,000. Irving used these materials as the basis for his 1837 book The Adventures of Captain Bonneville. These three works made up Irving's "western" series of books and were written partly as a response to criticism that his time in England and Spain had made him more European than American. Critics such as James Fenimore Cooper and Philip Freneau felt that he had turned his back on his American heritage in favor of English aristocracy. Irving's western books were well received in the United States, particularly A Tour on the Prairies, though British critics accused him of "book-making".

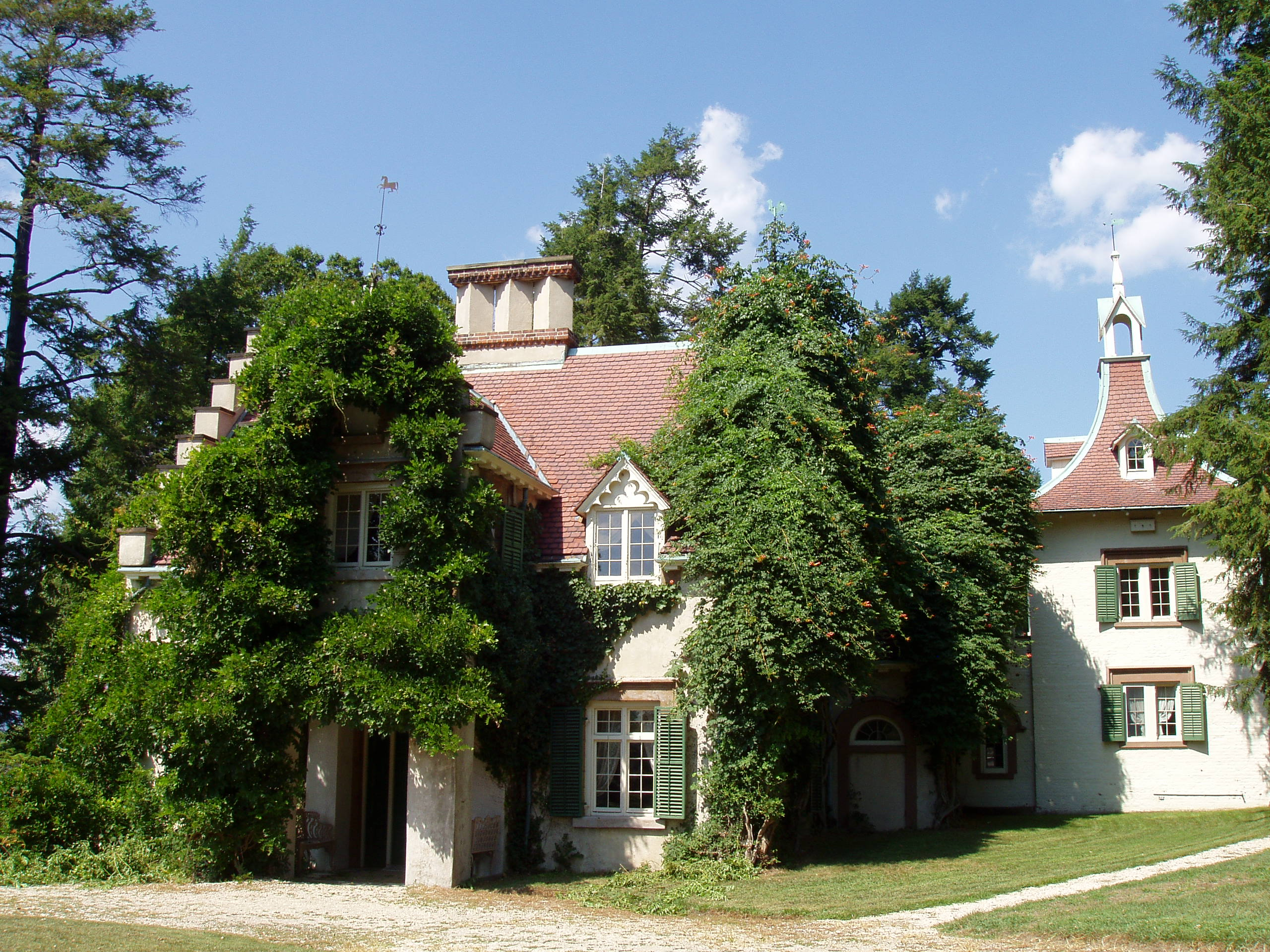
Irving acquired his famous home in Tarrytown, New York, known as Sunnyside, in 1835.

In 1835, Irving purchased a "neglected cottage" and its surrounding riverfront property in Tarrytown, New York, which he named Sunnyside in 1841. It required constant repair and renovation over the next 20 years, with costs continually escalating, so he reluctantly agreed to become a regular contributor to The Knickerbocker magazine in 1839, writing new essays and short stories under the Knickerbocker and Crayon pseudonyms. He was regularly approached by aspiring young authors for advice or endorsement, including Edgar Allan Poe, who sought Irving's comments on "William Wilson" and "The Fall of the House of Usher".

In 1837, a lady of Charleston, South Carolina, brought to the attention of William Clancy, newly appointed bishop to Demerara, a passage in The Crayon Miscellany, and questioned whether it accurately reflected Catholic teaching or practice. The passage under "Newstead Abbey" read:

One of the parchment scrolls thus discovered, throws rather an awkward light upon the kind of life led by the friars of Newstead. It is an indulgence granted to them for a certain number of months, in which a plenary pardon is assured in advance for all kinds of crimes, among which, several of the most gross and sensual are specifically mentioned, and the weaknesses of the flesh to which they were prone.

Clancy wrote to Irving, who "promptly aided the investigation into the truth, and promised to correct in future editions the misrepresentation complained of". Clancy traveled to his new posting by way of England, and bearing a letter of introduction from Irving, stopped at Newstead Abbey and was able to view the document to which Irving had alluded. Upon inspection, Clancy discovered that it was, in fact, not an indulgence issued to the friars from any ecclesiastical authority, but a pardon given by the king to some parties suspected of having broken "forest laws". Clancy requested the local pastor to forward his findings to Catholic periodicals in England, and upon publication, send a copy to Irving. Whether this was done is not clear as the disputed text remains in the 1849 edition.

Irving also championed America's maturing literature, advocating stronger copyright laws to protect writers from the kind of piracy that had initially plagued The Sketch Book. Writing in the January 1840 issue of Knickerbocker, he openly endorsed copyright legislation pending in Congress. "We have a young literature", he wrote, "springing up and daily unfolding itself with wonderful energy and luxuriance, which ... deserves all its fostering care". The legislation, however, did not pass at that time.

In 1841, Irving was elected to the National Academy of Design as an Honorary Academician. He also began a friendly correspondence with Charles Dickens and hosted Dickens and his wife at Sunnyside during Dickens's American tour in 1842.

=== Minister to Spain ===
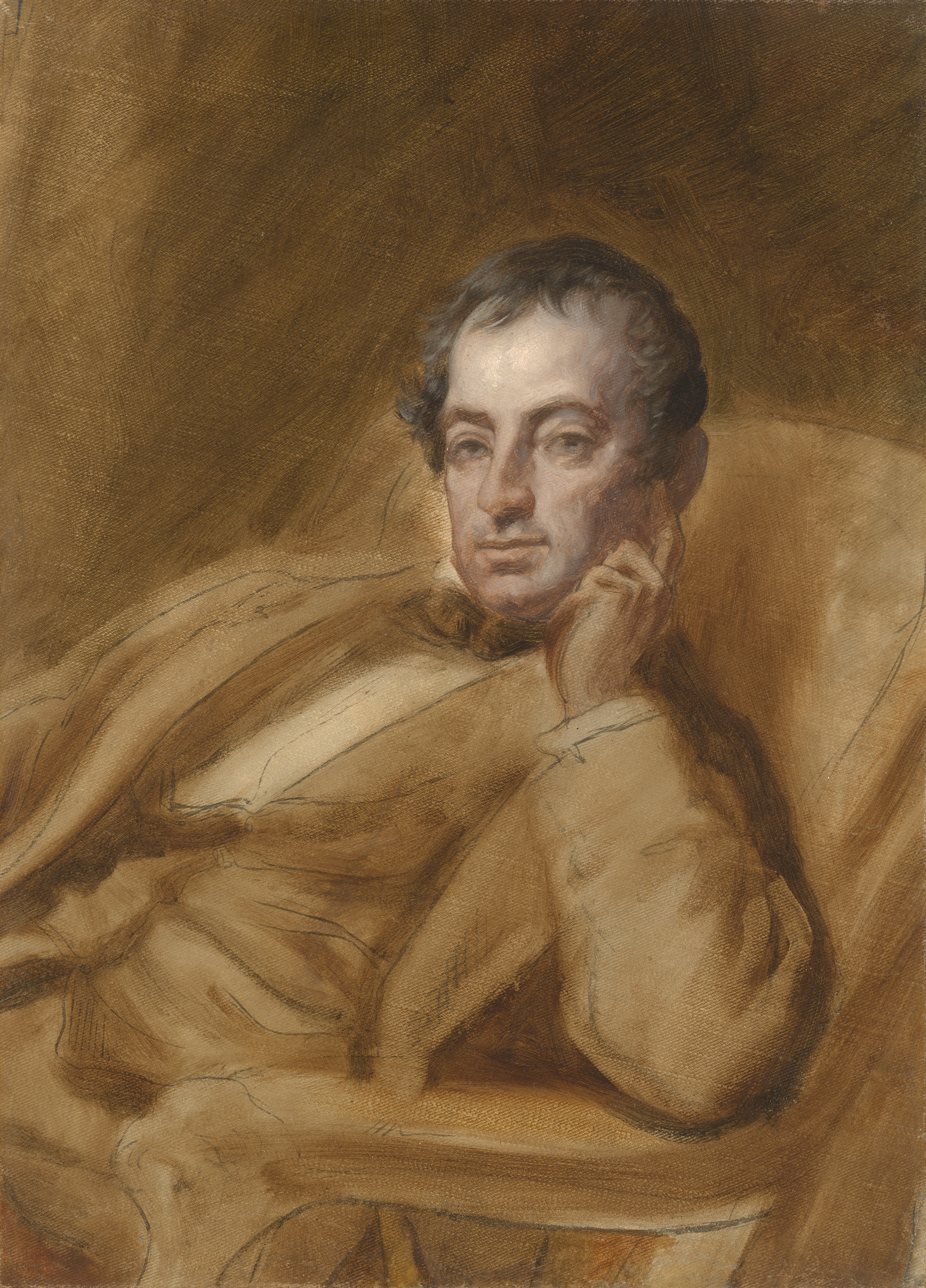
Portrait of Irving c. 1840, by Daniel Huntington

President John Tyler appointed Irving as Minister to Spain in February 1842, after an endorsement from Secretary of State Daniel Webster. Irving wrote, "It will be a severe trial to absent myself for a time from my dear little Sunnyside, but I shall return to it better enabled to carry it on comfortably". He hoped that his position as Minister would allow him plenty of time to write, but Spain was in a state of political upheaval during most of his tenure, with a number of warring factions vying for control of the 12-year-old Queen Isabella II. Irving maintained good relations with the various generals and politicians, as control of Spain rotated through Espartero, Bravo, then Narváez. Espartero was then locked in a power struggle with the Spanish Cortes. Irving's official reports on the ensuing civil war and revolution expressed his romantic fascination with the regent as young Queen Isabella's knight protector. He wrote with an anti-republican, undiplomatic bias. Though Espartero, ousted in July 1843, remained a fallen hero in his eyes, Irving began to view Spanish affairs more realistically. However, the politics and warfare were exhausting, and Irving was both homesick and suffering from a crippling skin condition.

I am wearied and at times heartsick of the wretched politics of this country .... The last ten or twelve years of my life, passed among sordid speculators in the United States, and political adventurers in Spain, has shewn me so much of the dark side of human nature, that I begin to have painful doubts of my fellow man; and look back with regret to the confiding period of my literary career, when, poor as a rat, but rich in dreams, I beheld the world through the medium of my imagination and was apt to believe men as good as I wished them to be.

With the political situation relatively settled in Spain, Irving continued to closely monitor the development of the new government and the fate of Isabella. His official duties as Spanish Minister also involved negotiating American trade interests with Cuba and following the Spanish parliament's debates over the slave trade. He was also pressed into service by Louis McLane, the American Minister to the Court of St. James's in London, to assist in negotiating the Anglo-American disagreement over the Oregon border that newly elected president James K. Polk had vowed to resolve.

=== Final years ===
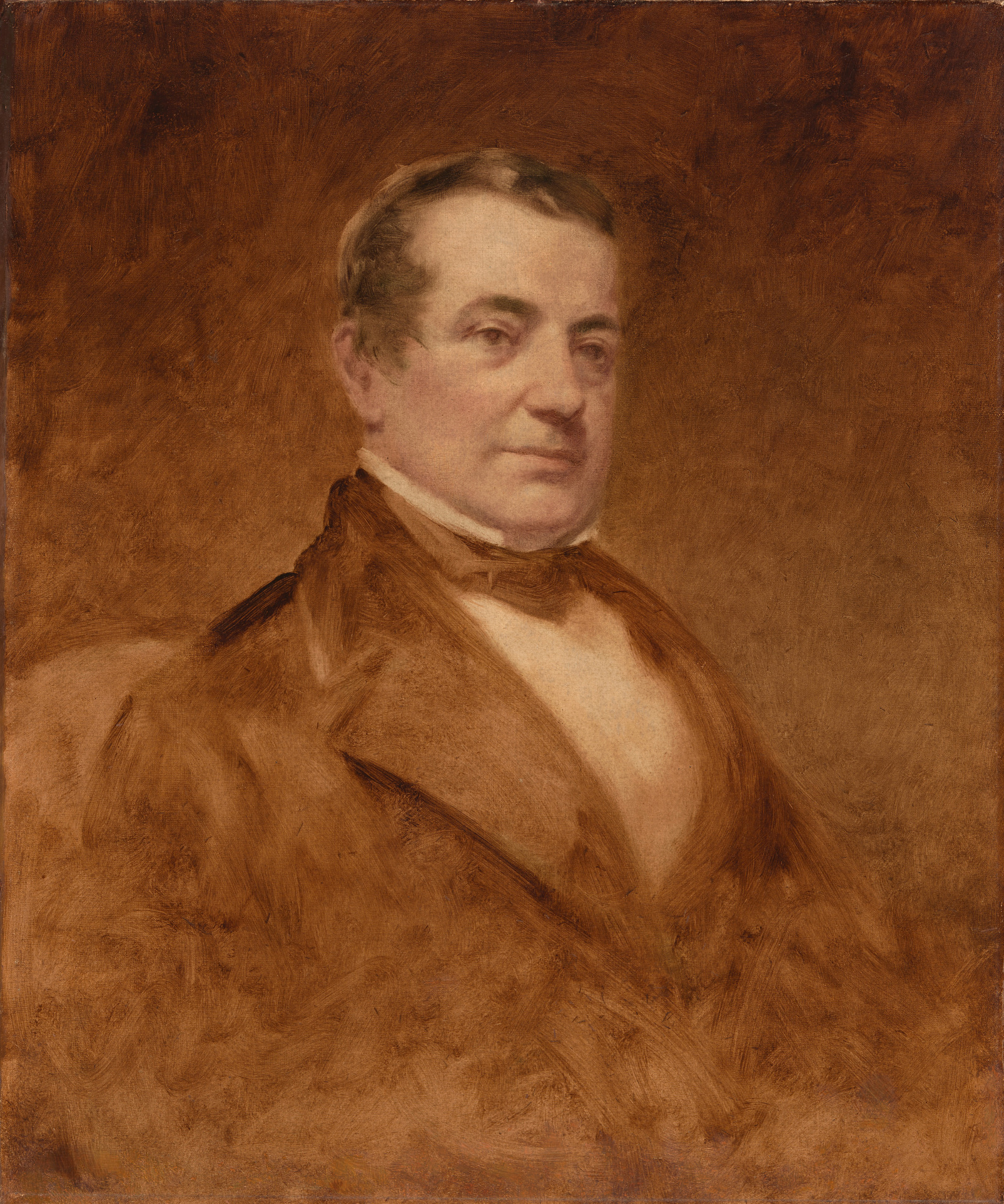
Portrait of Irving in the final year of his life, by Charles Loring Elliott

Irving returned from Spain in September 1846, took up residence at Sunnyside, and began work on an "Author's Revised Edition" of his works for publisher George Palmer Putnam. For its publication, Irving had made a deal which guaranteed him 12 percent of the retail price of all copies sold, an agreement that was unprecedented at that time. As he revised his older works for Putnam, he continued to write regularly, publishing biographies of Oliver Goldsmith in 1849 and Islamic prophet Muhammad in 1850. In 1855, he produced Wolfert's Roost, a collection of stories and essays that he had written for The Knickerbocker and other publications, and he began publishing a biography of his namesake George Washington which he expected to be his masterpiece. Five volumes of the biography were published between 1855 and 1859.

Irving traveled regularly to Mount Vernon and Washington, D.C., for his research, and struck up friendships with Presidents Millard Fillmore and Franklin Pierce. He was elected an Associate Fellow of the American Academy of Arts and Sciences in 1855. He was hired as an executor of John Jacob Astor's estate in 1848 and appointed by Astor's will as first chairman of the Astor Library, a forerunner to the New York Public Library.

Irving continued to socialize and keep up with his correspondence well into his seventies, and his fame and popularity continued to soar. "I don't believe that any man, in any country, has ever had a more affectionate admiration for him than that given to you in America", wrote Senator William C. Preston in a letter to Irving. "I believe that we have had but one man who is so much in the popular heart". By 1859, author Oliver Wendell Holmes Sr. noted that Sunnyside had become "next to Mount Vernon, the best known and most cherished of all the dwellings in our land".

=== Death ===
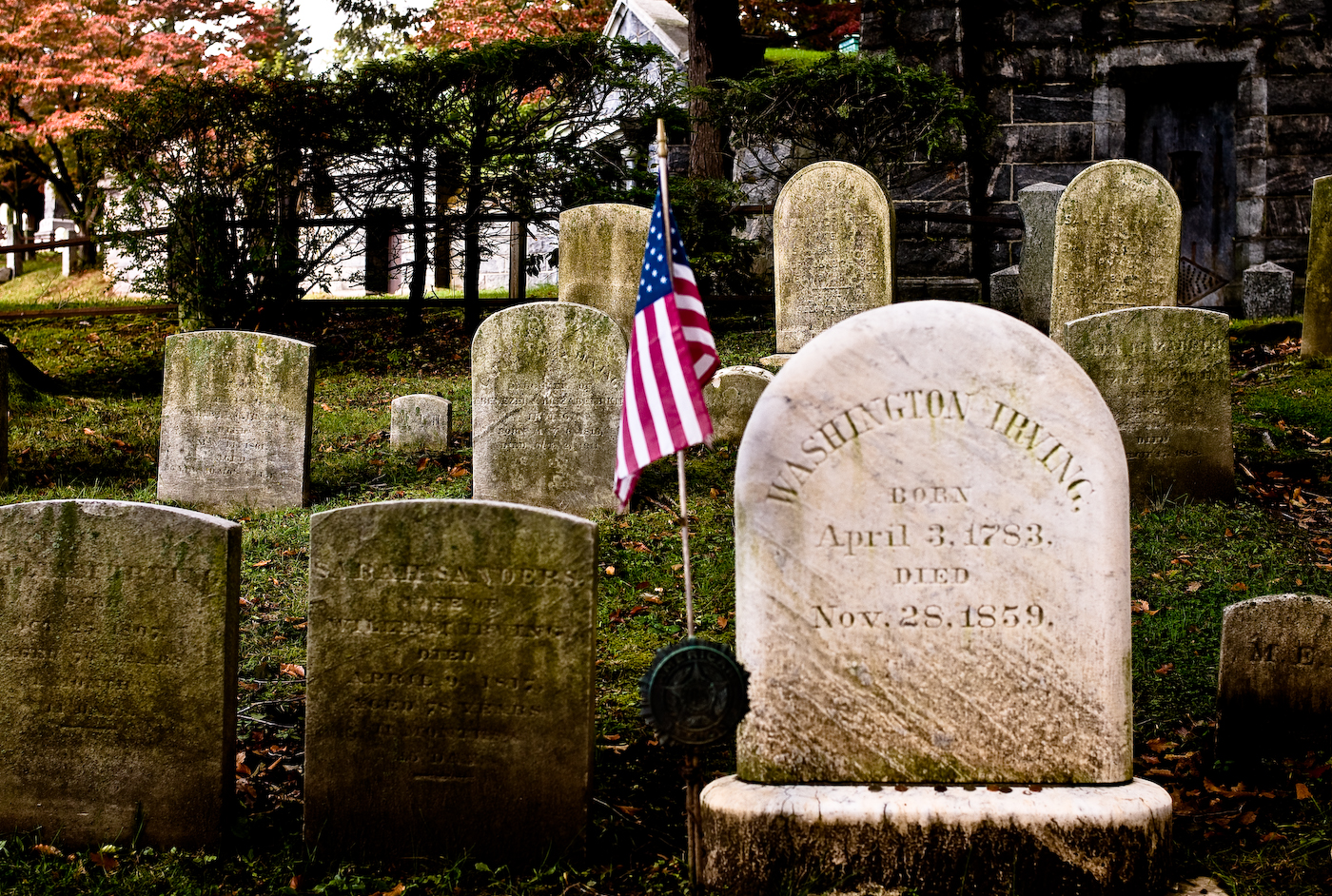
Washington Irving's headstone, Sleepy Hollow Cemetery, Sleepy Hollow, New York

Irving died of a heart attack in his bedroom at Sunnyside on November 28, 1859, age 76—only eight months after completing the final volume of his Washington biography. Legend has it that his last words were: "Well, I must arrange my pillows for another night. When will this end?" He was buried under a simple gravestone in Sleepy Hollow Cemetery (then called Tarrytown Cemetery) on December 1, 1859. In 1865, the cemetery board of trustees would posthumously honor Irving's request that its name be changed to Sleepy Hollow Cemetery.

Irving's funeral on December 1, 1859, was a massive national event. The crowd at Christ Episcopal Church in Tarrytown was so large that it was feared the floors would collapse and the church would have to be rebuilt. Thousands of people lined the streets to watch the procession. Across the nation, flags were held at half-mast at the news of his passing. Despite his immense fame, Irving chose a remarkably simple headstone with no epitaph, engraved only with his name and dates, located in the family plot. Irving and his grave were commemorated by Henry Wadsworth Longfellow in his 1876 poem "In the Churchyard at Tarrytown", which concludes with:

How sweet a life was his; how sweet a death!
Living, to wing with mirth the weary hours,
Or with romantic tales the heart to cheer;
Dying, to leave a memory like the breath
Of summers full of sunshine and of showers,
A grief and gladness in the atmosphere.

== Legacy ==
=== Literary reputation ===
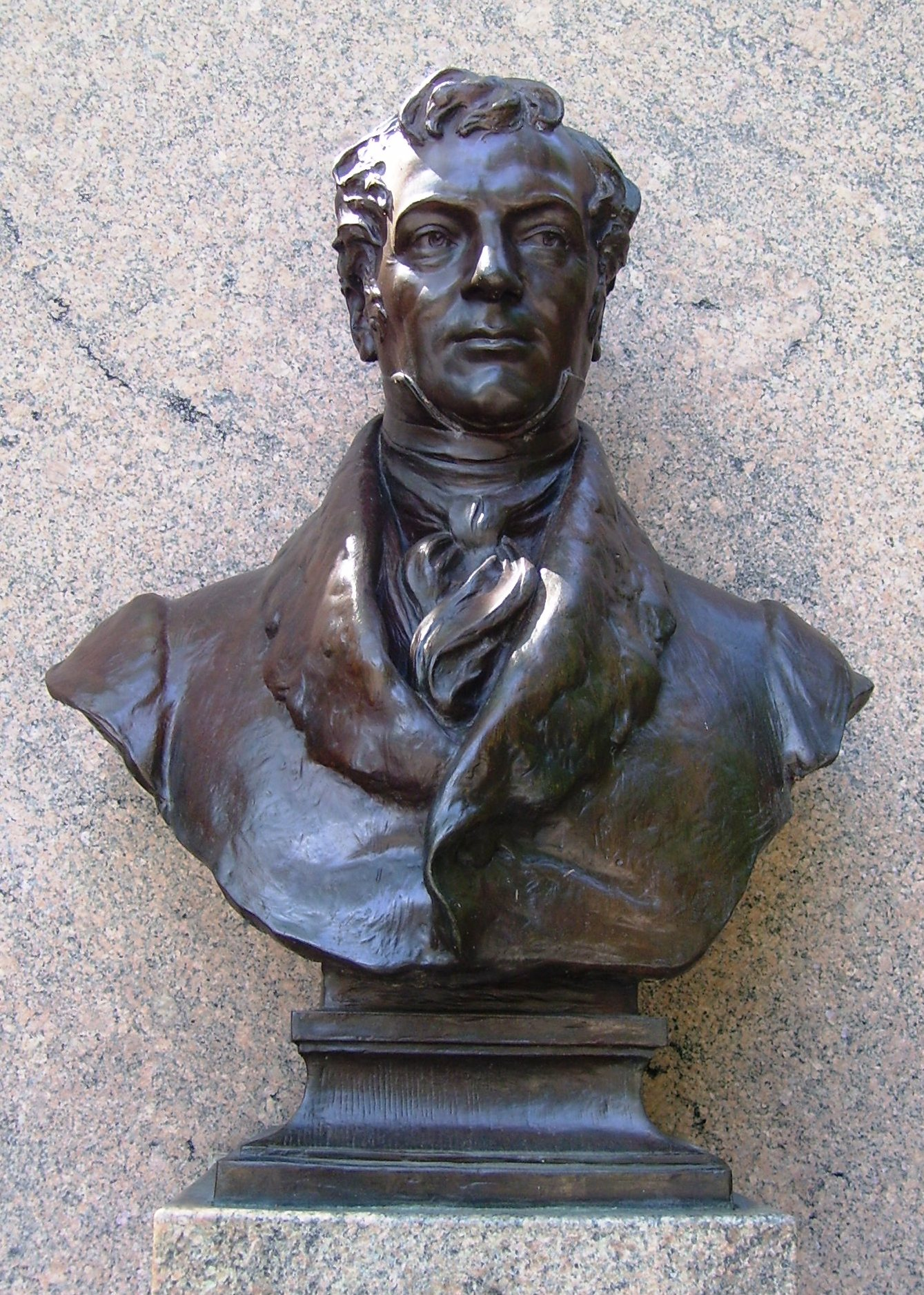
Bust of Washington Irving by Daniel Chester French in Irvington, New York, not far from Sunnyside

Irving is largely credited as the first American Man of Letters and the first to earn his living solely by his pen. Henry Wadsworth Longfellow acknowledged Irving's role in promoting American literature in December 1859: "We feel a just pride in his renown as an author, not forgetting that, to his other claims upon our gratitude, he adds also that of having been the first to win for our country an honourable name and position in the History of Letters".

Irving is considered to have perfected the American short story and was the first American writer to set his stories firmly in the United States, even as he poached from German or Dutch folklore. He is also generally credited as one of the first to write in the vernacular and without an obligation to presenting morals or being didactic in his short stories, writing stories simply to entertain rather than to enlighten. He also encouraged many would-be writers. As George William Curtis noted, there "is not a young literary aspirant in the country, who, if he ever personally met Irving, did not hear from him the kindest words of sympathy, regard, and encouragement".

Edgar Allan Poe, on the other hand, felt that Irving should be given credit for being an innovator but that the writing itself was often unsophisticated. "Irving is much over-rated", Poe wrote in 1838, "and a nice distinction might be drawn between his just and his surreptitious and adventitious reputation—between what is due to the pioneer solely, and what to the writer". A critic for the New-York Mirror wrote: "No man in the Republic of Letters has been more overrated than Mr. Washington Irving". Some critics claimed that Irving catered to British sensibilities, and one critic charged that he wrote "of and for England, rather than his own country". For instance, American critic John Neal in his 1824–25 critical work American Writers dismissed Irving as a poor copy of Goldsmith.

Other critics were more supportive of Irving's style. William Makepeace Thackeray was the first to refer to Irving as the "ambassador whom the New World of Letters sent to the Old", a banner picked up by writers and critics throughout the 19th and 20th centuries. "He is the first of the American humorists, as he is almost the first of the American writers", wrote critic H.R. Hawless in 1881, "yet belonging to the New World, there is a quaint Old World flavor about him". Early critics often had difficulty separating Irving the man from Irving the writer. "The life of Washington Irving was one of the brightest ever led by an author", wrote Richard Henry Stoddard, an early Irving biographer. Later critics, however, began to review his writings as all style with no substance. "The man had no message", said critic Barrett Wendell.

As a historian, Irving's reputation had fallen out of favor but then gained a resurgence. "With the advent of 'scientific' history in the generations that followed his, Irving's historical writings lapsed into disregard and disrespect. To late 19th- and early 20th-century historians, including John Franklin Jameson, G. P. Gooch, and others, these works were demiromances, worthy at best of veiled condescension. However, more recently several of Irving's histories and biographies have again won praise for their reliability as well as the literary skill with which they were written. Specifically, A History of the Life and Voyages of Christopher Columbus; Astoria, or Anecdotes of an Enterprise beyond the Rocky Mountains; and Life of George Washington have earned the respect of scholars whose writings on those topics we consider authoritative in our generation: Samuel Eliot Morison, Bernard DeVoto, Douglas Southall Freeman".

=== Impact on American culture ===
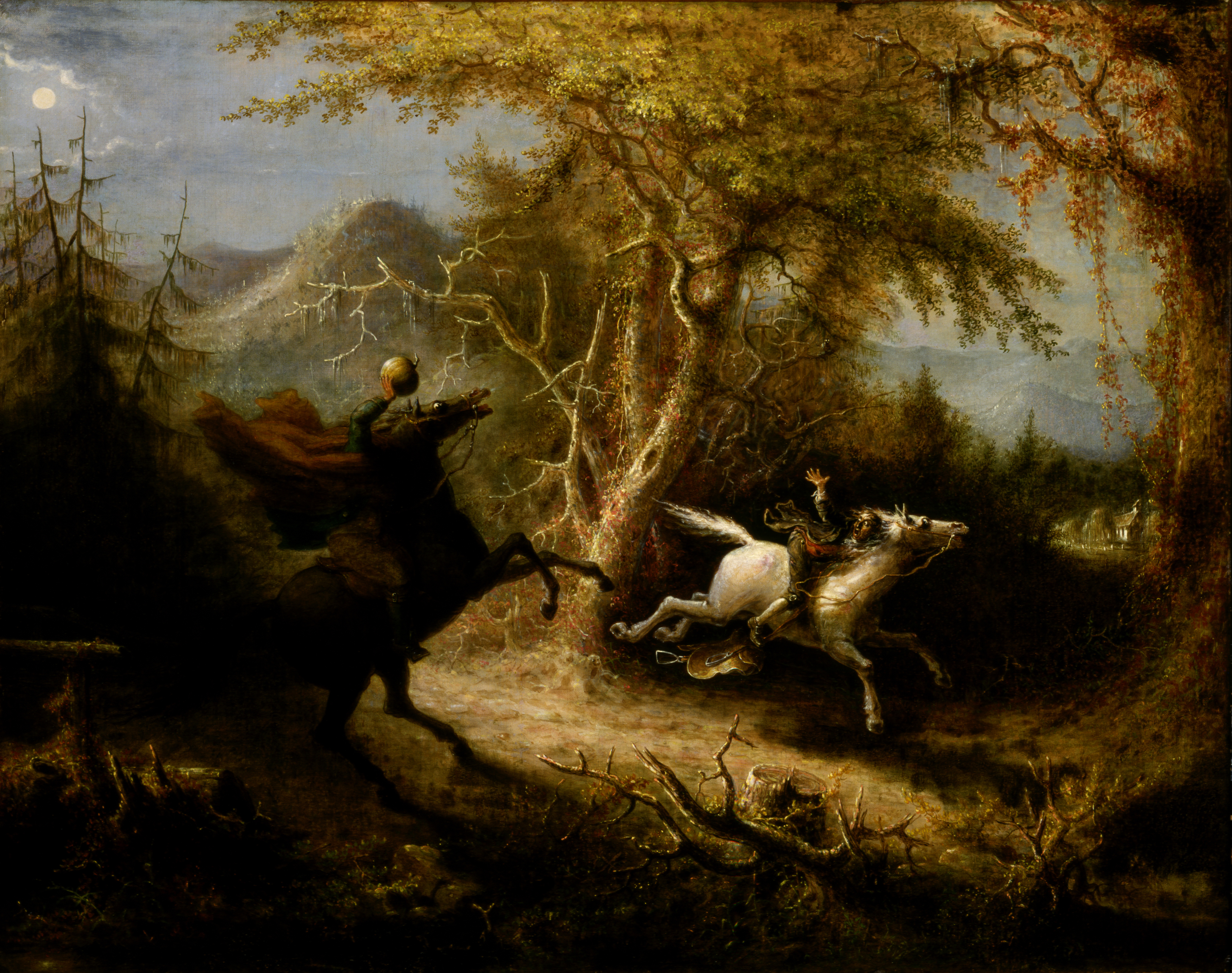
John Quidor's 1858 painting The Headless Horseman Pursuing Ichabod Crane, inspired by Washington Irving's work

Irving popularized the nickname "Gotham" for New York City, and he is credited with inventing the expression "the almighty dollar". The surname of his fictional Dutch historian Diedrich Knickerbocker is generally associated with New York and New Yorkers, as found in New York's professional basketball team the New York Knickerbockers.

One of Irving's most lasting contributions to American culture is in the way that Americans celebrate Christmas. In his 1812 revisions to A History of New York, he inserted a dream sequence featuring St. Nicholas soaring over treetops in a flying wagon, an invention which others dressed up as Santa Claus. In his five Christmas stories in The Sketch Book, Irving portrayed an idealized celebration of old-fashioned Christmas customs at a quaint English manor which depicted English Christmas festivities that he experienced while staying in England, which had largely been abandoned. He used text from The Vindication of Christmas (London 1652) of old English Christmas traditions, and the book contributed to the revival and reinterpretation of the Christmas holiday in the United States.

Irving introduced the erroneous idea that Europeans believed the world to be flat prior to the discovery of the New World in his biography of Christopher Columbus, yet the flat-Earth myth has been taught in schools as fact to many generations of Americans. American painter John Quidor based many of his paintings on scenes from the works of Irving about Dutch New York, including such paintings as Ichabod Crane Flying from the Headless Horseman (1828), The Return of Rip Van Winkle (1849), and The Headless Horseman Pursuing Ichabod Crane (1858).

=== Memorials ===
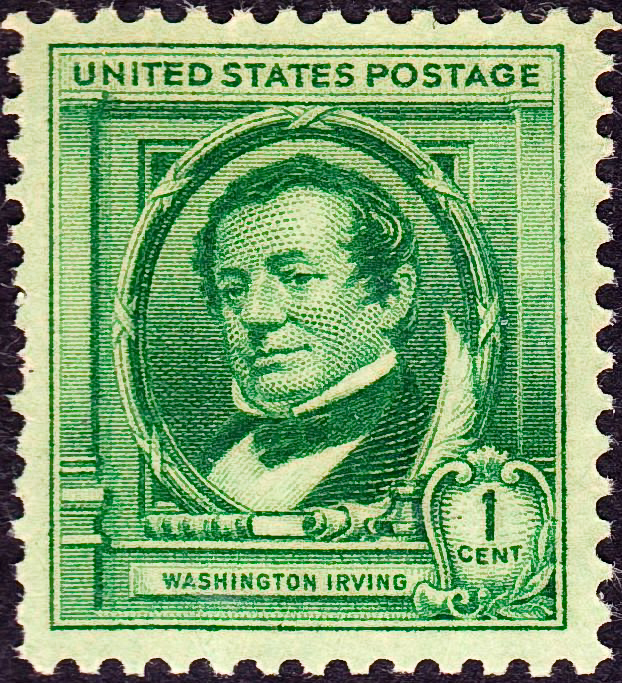
Washington Irving, postage stamp, 1940

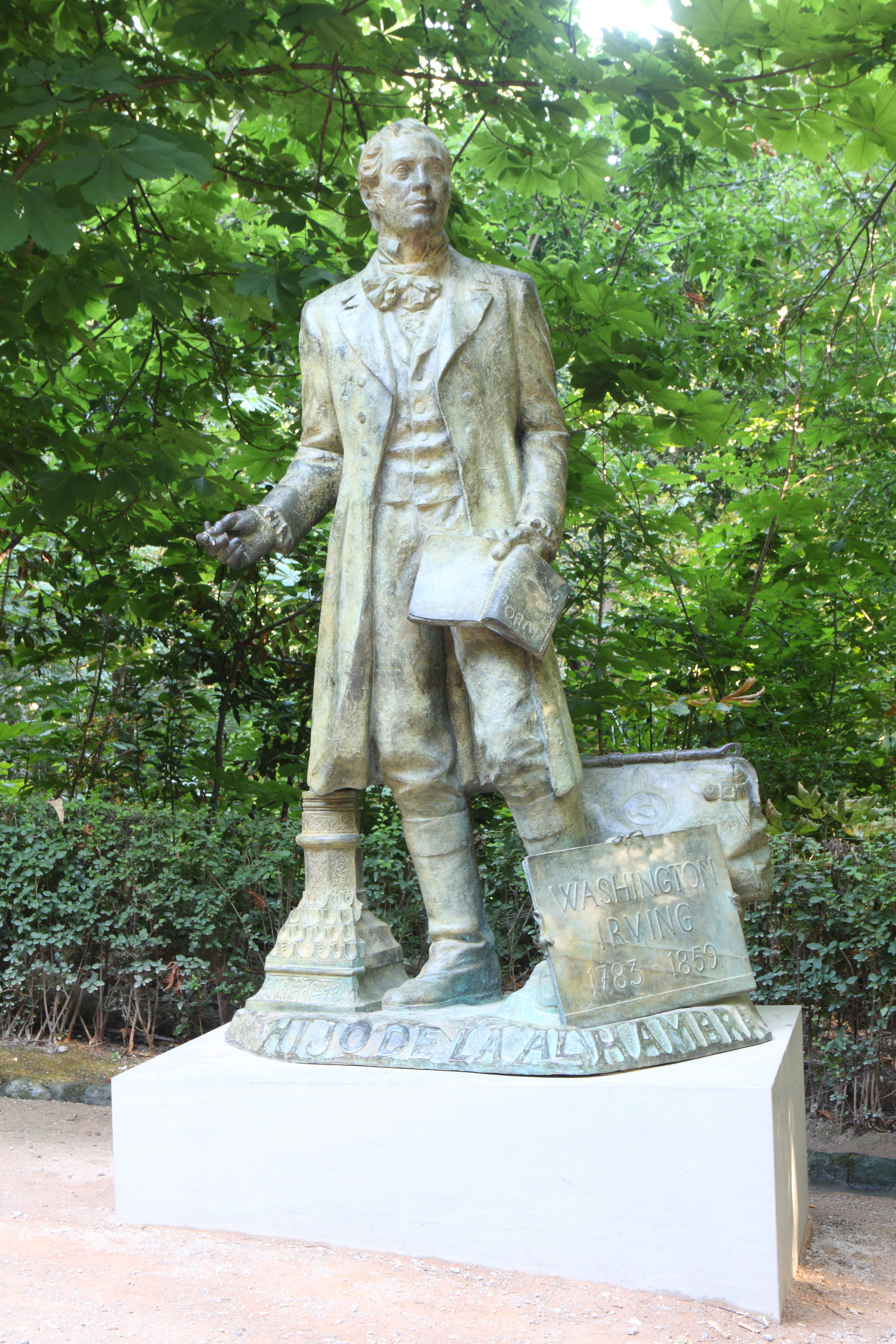
Statue in Granada, Spain

The village of Dearman, New York, changed its name to "Irvington" in 1854 to honor Washington Irving, who was living in nearby Sunnyside, which is preserved as a museum. Influential residents of the village prevailed upon the Hudson River Railroad, which had reached the village by 1849, to change the name of the train station to "Irvington", and the village incorporated as Irvington on April 16, 1872.

The town of Knickerbocker, Texas, was founded by two of Irving's nephews, who named it in honor of their uncle's literary pseudonym. The city of Irving, Texas, states that it is named for Washington Irving. Irvington, New Jersey is also named after Irving. It was incorporated on March 27, 1874, from parts of Clinton Township (Clinton Township is now part of Newark, New Jersey since 1902). Irving Street in San Francisco is named after him.

The Irving Park neighborhood in Chicago are named for him as well, though the original name of the subdivision was Irvington and then later Irving Park before annexation to Chicago. The major Chicago thoroughfare Illinois Route 19 is also named Irving Park Road. Gibbons Memorial Park, located in Honesdale, Pennsylvania, is located on Irving Cliff, which was named after him. The Irvington neighborhood in Indianapolis is also one of the many communities named after him.

Irving College (1838–1890) in Irving College, Tennessee, was named for Irving. There is also a statue of Irving in Granada, Spain. The Village of North Tarrytown, New York, changed its name to Sleepy Hollow in 1996 to honor Washington Irving and capitalize on the popularity of the story "The Legend Of Sleepy Hollow".

Washington Irving Memorial Park and Arboretum, located in Bixby, Oklahoma, is named in honor of Washington Irving and features an amphitheater stage with a replica façade of his Sunnyside home. The home includes a statue of Irving seated on the porch of the home. Among the tributes to Irving are memorials to the victims of the Oklahoma City Bombing and the World Trade Center attacks, with a steel beam from the towers on display. The park is also the site of local community events, including the annual Bixby BBQ and Blues festival.

In 1940, Washington Irving became the very first author to be honored on a U.S. postage stamp. (The 1-cent stamp was the first in the "American Authors" series, which also featured James Fenimore Cooper, Ralph Waldo Emerson, Louisa May Alcott, and Mark Twain.)

== Works ==
Works by Washington Irving
Title	Publication date	Written as	Genre
Letters of Jonathan Oldstyle	1802	Jonathan Oldstyle	Observational letters
Salmagundi	1807–1808	Launcelot Langstaff, Will Wizard	Periodical
A History of New York	1809	Diedrich Knickerbocker	Satire
The Sketch Book of Geoffrey Crayon, Gent.	1819–1820	Geoffrey Crayon	Short stories/essays
Bracebridge Hall	1822	Geoffrey Crayon	Short stories/essays
Tales of a Traveller	1824	Geoffrey Crayon	Short stories/essays
A History of the Life and Voyages of Christopher Columbus	1828	Washington Irving	Biography
A Chronicle of the Conquest of Granada	1829	Fray Antonio Agapida	Romantic history
Voyages and Discoveries of the Companions of Columbus	1831	Washington Irving	Biography/history
Tales of the Alhambra	1832	"The Author of the Sketch Book"	Short stories/travel
A Tour on the Prairies	1835	Washington Irving	Travel
The Crayon Miscellany	1835	Geoffrey Crayon	Short stories
Astoria	1836	Washington Irving	History
The Adventures of Captain Bonneville	1837	Washington Irving	Biography/romantic history
The Life of Oliver Goldsmith	1840 (revised 1849)	Washington Irving	Biography
Biography and Poetical Remains of the Late Margaret Miller Davidson	1841	Washington Irving	Biography
Mahomet and His Successors	1850	Washington Irving	Biography
Wolfert's Roost	1855	Geoffrey Crayon; Diedrich Knickerbocker; Washington Irving	Short stories/essays
The Life of George Washington (5 volumes)	1855–1859	Washington Irving	Biography
Moorish Chronicles	1891	Washington Irving	History

Diplomatic posts
Preceded by Aaron Vail	U.S. Minister to Spain; 1842–1846	Succeeded by Romulus M. Saunders
