= Dyberry =

Dyberry may refer to:

- Dyberry Creek, a tributary of the Lackawaxen River
- Dyberry Township, Wayne County, Pennsylvania
