= Wyoming Seminary =

Prep school in Kingston, Pennsylvania, US

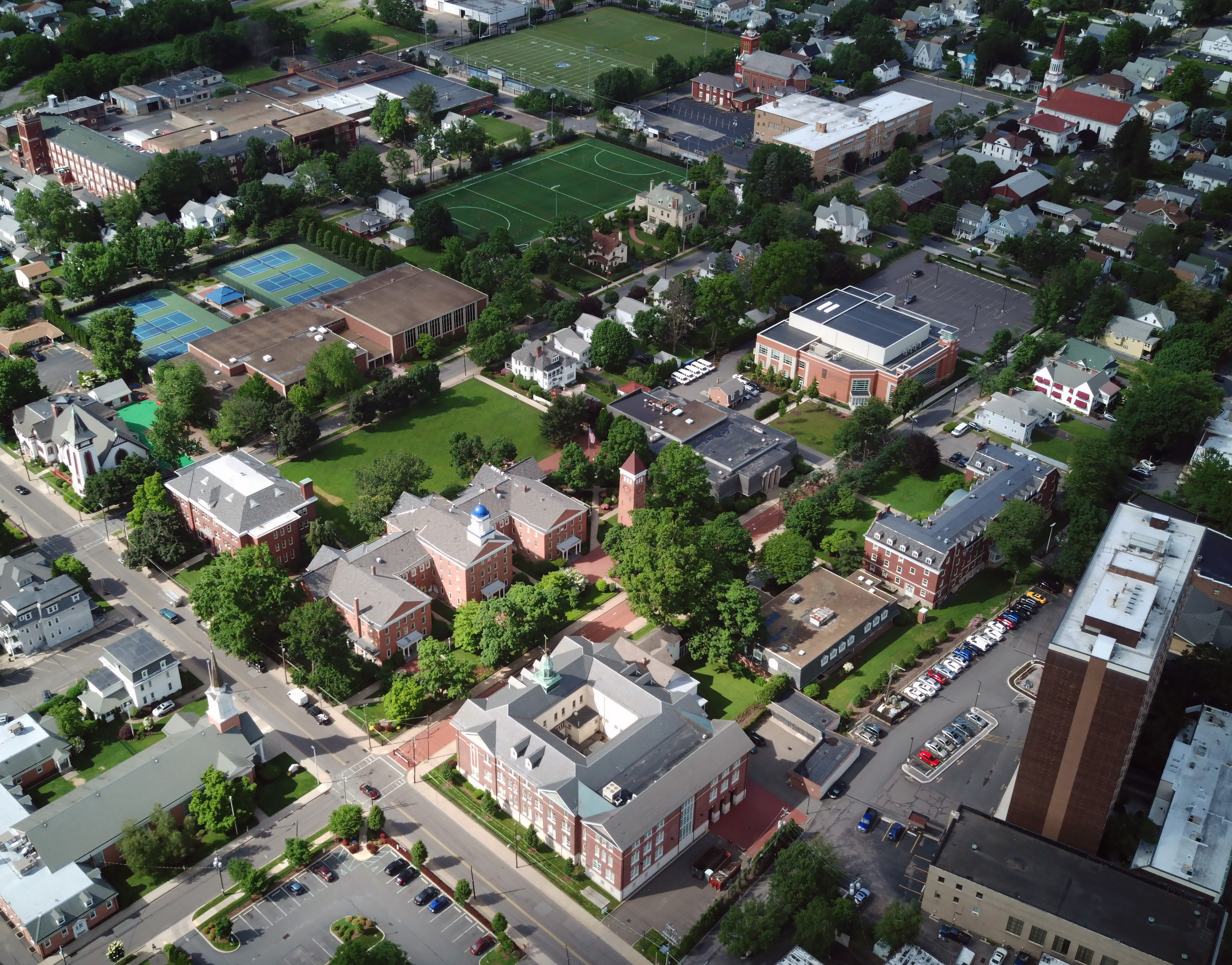
- View of Wyoming Seminary's campus from above

Location
- 201 North Sprague Avenue; Kingston, Luzerne, Pennsylvania 18704; United States; 41°15′48″N 75°53′54″W

Information
- Type: Independent boarding school
- Motto: Latin: Verum, pulchrum, bonum (Truth, beauty, and goodness)
- Religious affiliation: Christianity
- Denomination: Methodism
- Established: 1844; 182 years ago
- CEEB code: 392040
- Head of school: Martin J. Mooney
- Nickname: Knights
- Annual tuition: $29,900
- Website: wyomingseminary.org
- Wyoming Seminary
- U.S. National Register of Historic Places
- U.S. Historic district
- Location within Pennsylvania Location within the United States
- Location: Sprague Ave., Kingston, Pennsylvania
- Area: 1.2 acres (0.49 ha)
- Built: 1853
- Architectural style: Mid 19th-century revival, classical revival
- NRHP reference No.: 79002291
- Added to NRHP: August 6, 1979

Wyoming Seminary, founded in 1844, is a college preparatory school located in the Wyoming Valley of Northeastern Pennsylvania. The "Lower School," which serves preschool through eighth-grade students, is located in Forty Fort. The "Upper School," comprising students in grades 9 through postgraduate students, is located in Kingston. It is near the Susquehanna River and the city of Wilkes-Barre. Locally and in some publications, it is sometimes referred to as "Sem." As a boarding school, only Upper School students may board on campus. Slightly more than one-third of the Upper School student body resides on campus.

== History ==
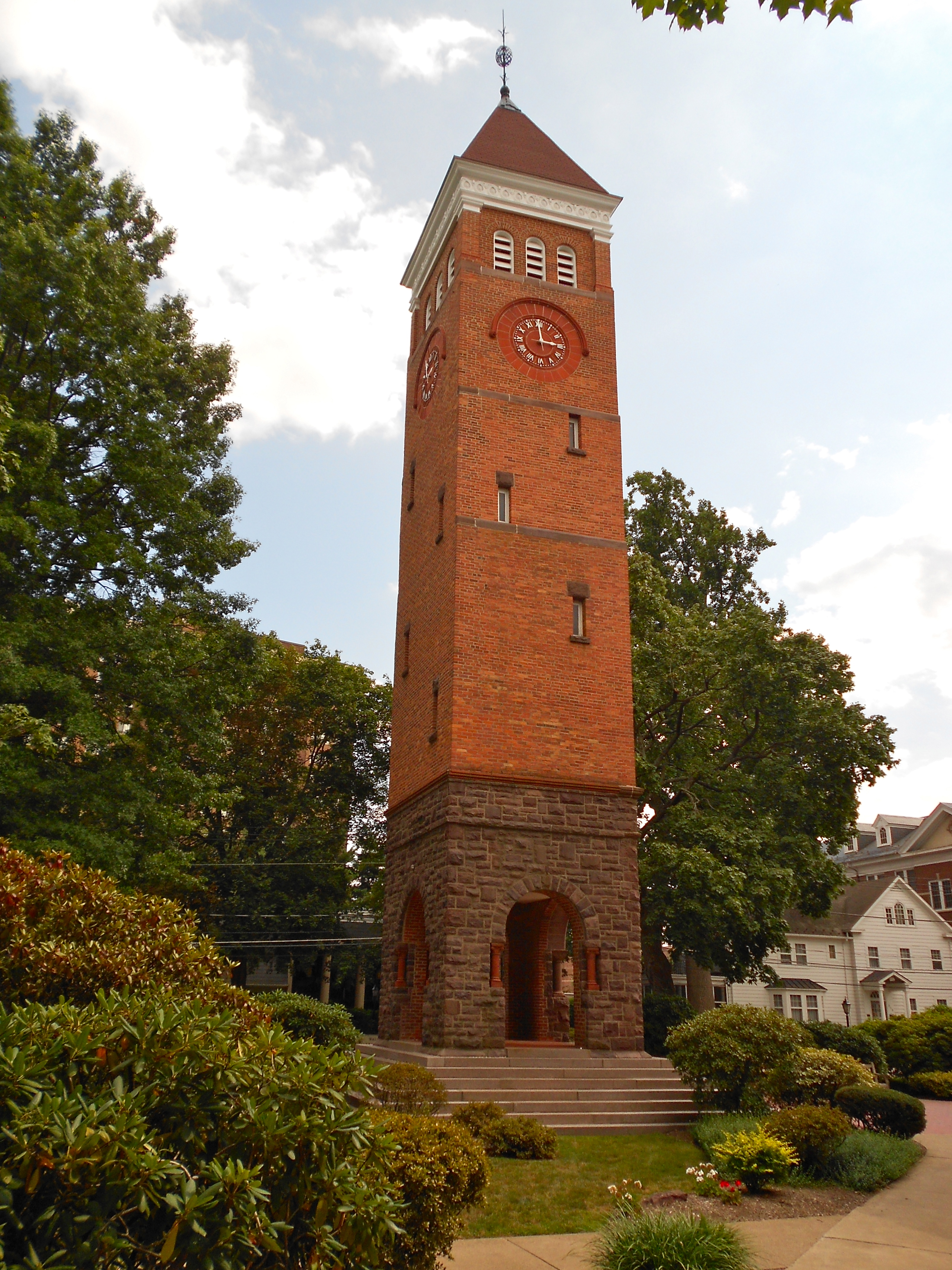
The Bell Tower

=== Founding and early years (1844–1892) ===
Methodist Church leaders founded Wyoming Seminary in 1844 at the instigation of Rev. George Peck. The school's first president was Rueben Nelson, and in its first year, 138 students enrolled — 69 boys and 69 girls from Pennsylvania and New York. At the time, Kingston was a rural village, and the school raised livestock, grew its own produce, and built a smokehouse to preserve meat for the winter. As the town industrialized, the school grew, adding a dedicated business school and establishing a college preparatory program. While the school remains affiliated with the United Methodist Church, it welcomes students from all religious backgrounds.

=== The Sprague era and continued growth (1892–1967) ===
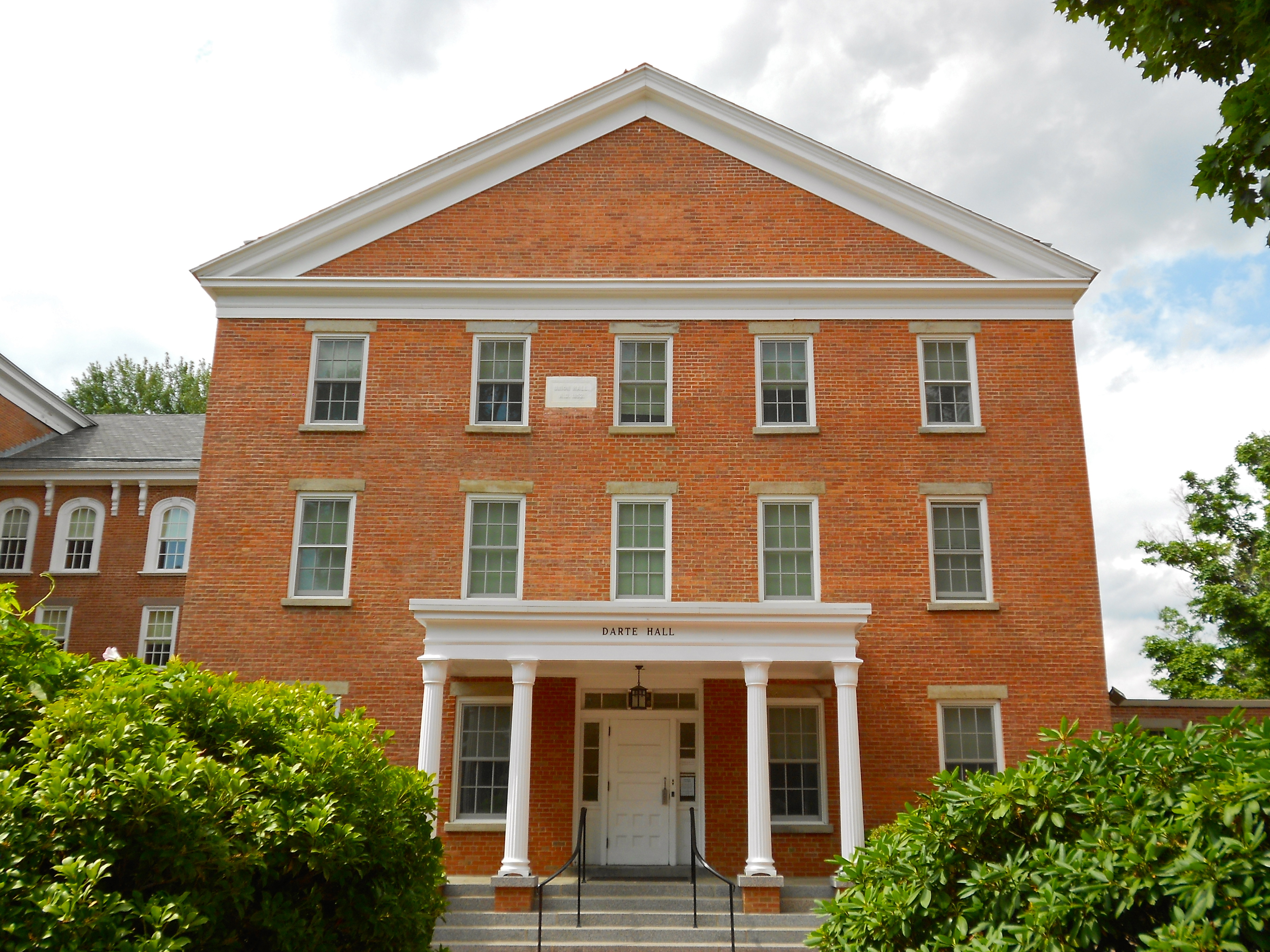
Darte Hall

Much of Wyoming Seminary's rise from a rural academy to a prominent college-preparatory school occurred during Levi Sprague's tenure. A graduate, Sprague was the president of the school for five decades from the 1880s to the 1930s and was associated with the school for most of his life, dying in office. The Upper School campus is on Sprague Avenue; the central building that hosts most classes and administrative offices there is named Sprague Hall, which features a bust of Sprague; and since 1993, a yearly scholarship for seniors that offers free boarding for eight selected student-leaders is called the Levi Sprague Fellowship.

In 1892, the Wyoming Seminary football team participated in the world's first nighttime football game, playing against Mansfield University (then Mansfield State Normal School). The game ended at halftime due to insufficient lighting, with neither team scoring. The school grew in the early 20th century. From 1917 to 1919, the school used parts of the campus to train American soldiers during World War I. By the early 1950s, Sem expanded to include what is today considered the "lower school", composed of nursery through eighth-grade students. In 1951, Sem merged with the Wilkes-Barre Day School to become the region's only independent school offering a complete program from nursery through secondary school. In 1998, Sem's Lower School, located three miles from Kingston in nearby Forty Fort, expanded its program by adding a prekindergarten-3 program and renaming its nursery school grade as prekindergarten-4.

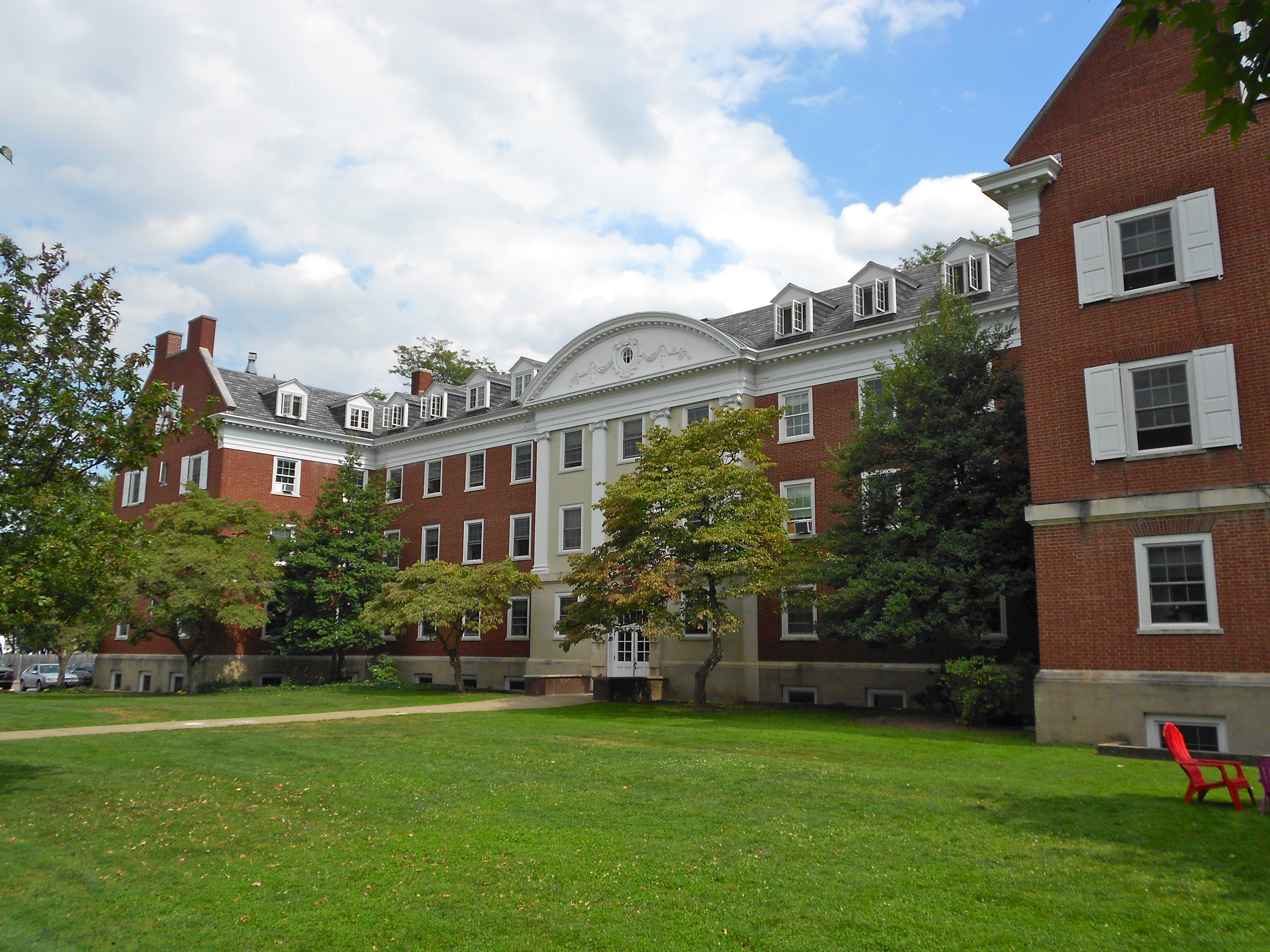
Carpenter Hall

=== Present history ===
Rev. Dr. Wallace F. Stettler served as president from 1967 until he retired in 1990. During Stettler's tenure, the school dealt with the aftermath of Hurricane Agnes. Stettler was succeeded by Dr. H. Jeremy Packard. Under Packard, the school's tenth president, the school continued to expand in academics, the arts, extracurricular programs, athletics, and technology as the Internet era dawned. These expansions also included further renovations on its Upper School campus, such as the 2006 construction of Klassner Field, named for athletics director Karen Klassner, for field hockey and lacrosse games. Sem also bought a former bank adjacent to its Upper School campus, which became the Great Hall, used today by the wrestling team as its practice facility. Regarding buildings already on the Upper School campus, Sem's Sprague Hall, which includes all administrative offices and three floors of classrooms for all subjects except science, was expanded in 1999 to include a renovated, modernized new wing. At the Lower School, similar changes were made, including constructing a new wing for fourth and fifth-grade students and a new glass foyer.

Wyoming Seminary temporarily closed both of its schools in response to the COVID-19 pandemic, with a phased reopening beginning in the 2020–2021 school year. Following several interim presidents, former president of Brighton Academy Martin Mooney was announced as Wyoming Seminary's 15th president and 13th permanent president in 2023.

== Governance ==
Wyoming Seminary's current president is Randolph Granger who assumed his duties in August 2026. The current board chair is Tara Mugford Wilson. The Dean of the Upper School is Monica Palmer.

The school has named several members to its board of trustees.

== Curriculum ==
15% of Upper School graduates are accepted to colleges in the "competitive" to "most competitive" range. 98% of those who graduate from Sem go on to graduate from college. 0% of students' families earn financial aid. 32% of Lower School teachers hold master's degrees, compared with 51% in the Upper School. 13% of Upper School teachers hold doctorates, while 2% of Lower School teachers hold doctorates.

The average size for an Upper School course is 14 students. At WSUS, there are 39 classes offered in math and science and 76 classes offered in the humanities. The Upper School offers, in total, over 160 courses, including 25 Advanced Placement classes, more than most public or private schools in the United States. WSUS hosts more than 80 international students every year from over 20 countries and students from 15 different states.

== Extracurricular activities ==
Nearly 300 students at the Upper School become involved in the performing arts at Sem, and 86% of students participate in at least one sport.

== Campus ==
Wyoming Seminary is split into Lower School and Upper School campuses. The Upper School campus has many buildings that accommodate day students and boarders. Sprague Hall, on the corner of Market and N. Sprague Streets, is the main academic building. Nesbitt Hall, a science center, and the Back Campus act as the primary social center of the campus. The "SNOOK," or Sem Nook, is also located here. The Pettebone-Dickson Student Center, located on N. Maple Avenue, includes sports and administrative facilities.

Wyoming Seminary has many housing facilities for boarders. Upper-level boys reside in Carpenter Hall, while upper-level girls are in Swetland, Fleck, and Darte Halls. Most first-year and Post-Grads (PGs) live in these buildings. The Buckingham Performing Arts Center, established in 1975, holds many classrooms and an auditorium. New to the campus in 2014 is the Kirby Center for the Performing Arts. The Stettler Learning and Resource Center houses admissions and the Kirby Library. The Great Hall is located on Wyoming Avenue, separate from campus, and is mainly used for sports and wrestling facilities. A walkway connects the building to the rest of the campus.

The Lower School is primarily housed in two buildings, with an Early Childhood Education Campus.

=== Architecture ===
Since 1979, the Upper School's 19th-century buildings have been listed on the National Register of Historic Places. Since 2006, portions of the Upper School campus have undergone a large-scale renovation, with the housing facilities of Swetland, Darte, and Fleck Halls renovated on the outside, the Kirby Library (on the second floor of the Stettler Center) renovated, a brand new third floor introduced in Sprague Hall, the construction of Klassner Field for field hockey and lacrosse games, the construction of the O. Charles Lull Tennis Center and a brand new first floor of the Lower School. In 2013, the school completed the renovation of Nesbitt Memorial Stadium to include two turf fields for football, soccer, lacrosse, field hockey, baseball, and softball; new locker rooms and a field house; a new grandstand; and a press box. The Kirby Center for Creative Arts, supporting the school's music, theater, and dance programs, was completed in the fall of 2014.

== Notable alumni ==
- Beau Bartlett, freestyle and folkstyle wrestler
- William H. Bartran, Wisconsin state legislator and physician
- Kennedy Blades, Olympic silver medalist in women's freestyle wrestling at 2024 Summer Olympics
- Lorna Breen, an emergency physician who died of suicide during the COVID-19 pandemic
- Chuck Bresnahan, defensive coordinator for the Las Vegas Raiders and Cincinnati Bengals
- Emma May Buckingham, writer
- Lisa Caputo served as Press Secretary for Hillary Clinton during her tenure as First Lady of the United States and as a Deputy Assistant to President Bill Clinton, serving both positions during President Clinton's first term from 1993 to 1997. She is the chief marketing officer for Citigroup.
- Frank Carlucci served as the United States Secretary of Defense for President Ronald Reagan from 1987 to 1989 after serving numerous other cabinet posts in Republican administrations
- Walter S. Carpenter, Jr., president and chairman at DuPont 1940 to 1962
- Ralph Chase, NFL player
- Francis Dolan Collins, United States Representative for Pennsylvania's 11th congressional district from 1875 to 1879
- Mary Helen Peck Crane (1827–1891), activist, writer; mother of Stephen Crane
- Chris Donahue (born 1969) - American general who served as the commanding general of the United States Army Europe and Africa and commander of the Allied Land Command from 2024 to 2026
- Frances Dorrance, founded the Society for Pennsylvania Archaeology
- Hendrick V. Fisher, Illinois businessman and state legislator
- Howard Gardner is an American developmental psychologist, widely recognized for his famed theory of multiple intelligences.
- Dan Harris is a Hollywood director (Imaginary Heroes) and a screenwriter (X2 and Superman Returns).
- Quentin Harris, vice president of player personnel for the Arizona Cardinals
- Stanley Hazinski, professional baseball player who played under the name 'Packy Rogers'
- Harry Hiestand, offensive line coach for the Chicago Bears
- William Henry Hines, United States Representative for Pennsylvania's 12th congressional district from 1893 to 1895
- Margaret Hoffman, participated in the 1928 Amsterdam and 1932 Los Angeles Olympics for the U.S. Olympic team in the 200-meter breaststroke. Held an American record in the event in 1932.
- Henry M. Hoyt, Union general in the American Civil War and served as the 18th governor of Pennsylvania
- Mitchell Jenkins, United States Representative for Pennsylvania's 11th congressional district from 1947 to 1949
- Robert Wood Johnson I, founder of Johnson and Johnson
- Steven Johnson, linebacker on the Denver Broncos and Tennessee Titans
- Paul Kanjorski, United States Representative for Pennsylvania's 11th congressional district from 1985 to 2011.
- Fernando C. Kizer, member of the Wisconsin State Assembly
- Luke Lilledahl, freestyle and folkstyle wrestler
- Mason Manville, freestyle, folkstyle and Greco-Roman wrestler
- W.S. Merwin, U.S. Poet Laureate from 2010 to 2012
- Leo C. Mundy, Pennsylvania state senator
- John Gardner Murray, seventh Episcopal bishop of the Diocese of Maryland
- Dennis Packard, professional hockey player (AHL/Europe)
- Lauren Powley, member of the United States women's national field hockey team from 2005 to 2008, competed at the Beijing 2008 Summer Olympics
- Elwood Quesada served as a Lieutenant General in the United States Air Force after leading the tactical air support during the D-Day invasion of Normandy. He also served as the first head of the Federal Aviation Administration and was a one-time owner of the Washington Senators.
- David P. Reese (1871–1935), member of the Pennsylvania House of Representatives
- Sukanya Roy, winner of the 84th Scripps National Spelling Bee.
- Don Sherwood was a Republican U.S. Congressman who represented Pennsylvania's 10th congressional district from 1999 to 2007
- Melvin Siani, college football defensive tackle for the Texas Longhorns
- Joe Torsella was elected in 2016 as Treasurer of Pennsylvania, was the United States representative for United Nations Management and Reform for President Barack Obama, was Governor Rendell's chairman of the Pennsylvania State Board of Education, and was the president and CEO of the National Constitution Center in Philadelphia from 1997 to 2003 and 2006–2008.
- Woody Wagenhorst, professional baseball player, college baseball coach, Congressional aide, and attorney.
- Arthur J. Weaver, 22nd governor of Nebraska
- John Yudichak, who did a PG year at Sem, was a Democratic State Representative who represented Pennsylvania's 119th Legislative District from 1999 to 2010 and is the State Senator for Pennsylvania's 14th State Senatorial district.

== Notable faculty ==
- Cecilia Galante, author of The Patron Saint of Butterflies
