= Tanners Falls, Pennsylvania =

Unincorporated community in Pennsylvania, US

- Village
- Village of Tanners Falls
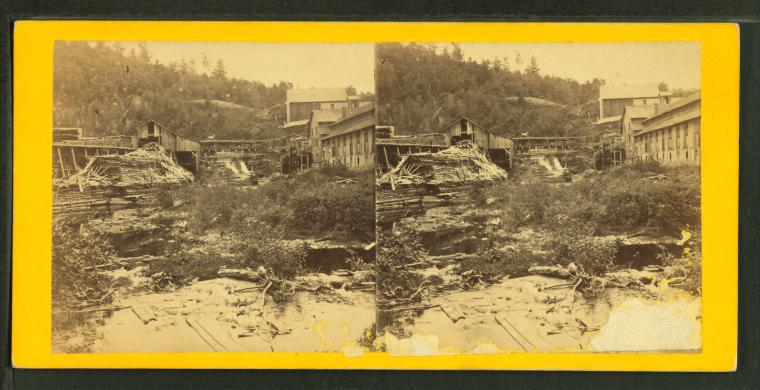
- The Tanners' Falls near the confluence of the East and West Branches of the Dyberry Creek, in Tanners Falls.
- Nicknames: Dyberry Falls (historical), Tanner's Falls
- Tanners Falls' Location within Pennsylvania.
- Coordinates: 41°39′39″N 75°17′18″W
- Country: United States
- State: Pennsylvania
- U.S. Congressional District: PA-8
- School District: Wayne Highlands; Region II
- County: Wayne
- Magisterial District: 22-3-04
- Township: Dyberry
- Settled: c. 1830
- Founder: Jason Torrey
- Named for: Tanners' Falls (water feature)
- Elevation: 1,043 ft (318 m)
- Time zone: UTC-5 (Eastern (EST))
  - Summer (DST): UTC-4 (Eastern Daylight (EDT))
- ZIP codes: De facto 18431 (Honesdale)
- Area code: 570
- GNIS feature ID: 1204801
- FIPS code: 42-127-20576-76058
- Waterways: Camp Cayuga Lake, Dyberry Creek (East and West Branches and union), Lake Cayuga, Long Pond

Tanners Falls is a village in Dyberry Township, Wayne County, Pennsylvania, United States, located in the Lake Region of the Poconos.

It is located roughly six miles from Honesdale, Pennsylvania.

== History ==
Established circa 1830, this village was served by the Honesdale branch of the U.S. Post Office during the 1850s and 1860s. The village was still largely a rural one during this time.

A new tannery was established at Tanners Falls by Lewis B. Richtmyer during the early 1850s. Finishing its first hides in 1853, the operation quickly expanded its capacity to fifty-two thousand hides annually, using a manufacturing system of more than one hundred and seventy vats. Richtmyer's older brother, Henry Richtmyer, subsequently became the village's first Postmaster when its new post office opened in 1856.

During the 1860s, one of Wayne County's chief industries was the manufacture of shoe leather. As a result, the county was home to several tanneries and shoe and bootmakers. Thomas Conroy, an emigrant from Ireland, operated a shoemaking and boot repair business in Tanners Falls during the 1860s and 1870s.

The tannery, which had been operating in the village during the early 1860s, was purchased in 1863 by Coe F. Young, a native of New York who had previously been associated with various canal and railway operations.

The Hilltop church was built by members of the Catholic church in 1865 "to accommodate the faithful at Tanners Falls."

In May 1870, Wayne County officials initiated the process to begin rebuilding the bridge at Tanners Falls.

In September 1876, Tanners Falls was one of multiple communities facing disaster as wildfires swept across northwestern Pennsylvania.

Lumber industry and tannery operations were active in Tanners Falls during the 1870s and 1880s. The tannery owned by Coe F. Young ceased operations during the spring of 1887 because the area's tree bark supply had been exhausted.

Mary W. Alberty was appointed Postmaster of Tanners Falls in January 1889. Repairs were made to the Tanners Falls bridge in late 1889 with lumber supplied by Coe F. Young and labor performed by C. P. Bunnell at respective costs to Wayne County of $33.79 and $10.00.

Oil and coal prospecting ventures were also tried by Coe F. Young and others beginning in the 1880s; they continued off and on into the early 1900s.

In 1891, Joseph Taylor entered into a partnership with John Reifler & Sons in creating and managing a large acid works factory in Tanners Falls. Reifler, an emigrant from Gomeringen, Germany, had previously been involved in the tanning industry.

New stone arch and lumber work were completed on the Tanners Fall bridge in 1893 by John Reifler, J. Schilling, and Riefler & Sons at respective costs to Wayne County of $395, $6, and $344.47.

Telephone service became available for the first time in Tanners Falls in the summer of 1896.

Additional stone arch work was completed again at the Tanners Fall bridge in 1898 by John D. Irwin at a cost to Wayne County of $738.62.

=== 1900s ===
On April 27, 1900, the Commonwealth of Pennsylvania issued a new operating charter to the Spring Brook Creamery in Tanners Falls. In December 1900, the Pennsylvania Bridge Company was awarded an $800 contract by Wayne County to build the middle span of the county's iron bridge at Tanners Falls.

In May 1911, the Reifler Acid Company's Tanners Falls complex was destroyed during an early morning fire. By mid-October, work was nearly completed on the construction of a new wood alcohol manufacturing facility.

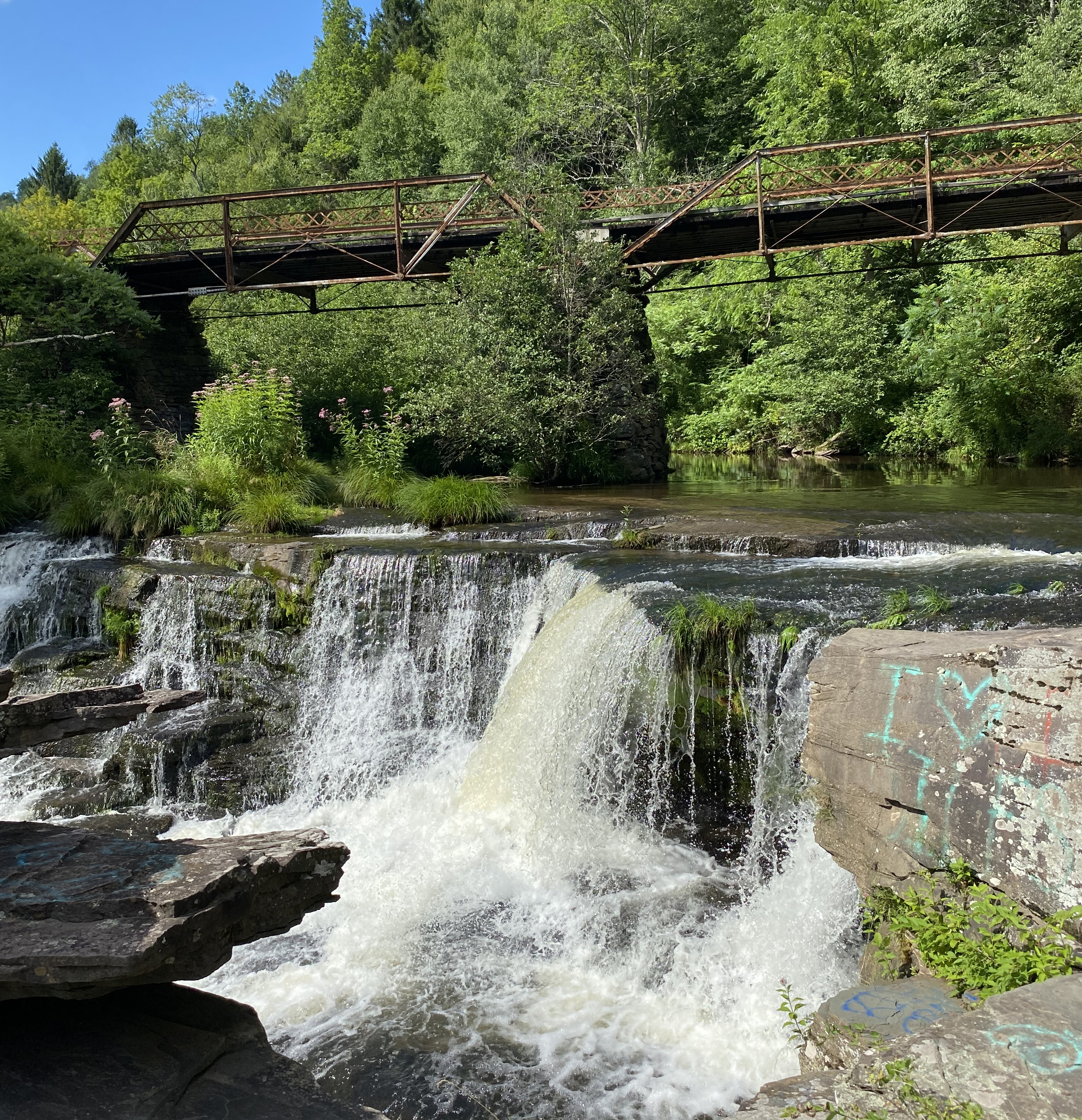

By the 1920s, the acid company had become such an integral part of Tanners Falls that it owned the majority of the village's buildings, including many of the houses that were then rented out to employees of the company and the providers of various shops and other community services who had been brought it to provide conveniences for those employees.

That situation changed, however, when the acid company was permanently closed on April 8, 1931. After its owners made their last shipment and terminated their workforce, the plant was auctioned off during a receiver's sale on May 5 of that year, along with eight thousand two hundred and fifty acres of forest land and thirty-five of the village's houses that the company had owned. The company had been placed into receivership due to an unpaid bill from 1928 of $4,000 that had accrued additional interest charges, as well as the company's indebtedness of $150,000 for its first mortgage, $160,000 owed by the company on two Series A and Series B debenture bonds, and additional unpaid debts of $75,000 and $25,000.

As concern regarding the negative impact the plant's closure would have on Wayne County and the surrounding region, civic and business leaders investigated possible ways to mitigate the sale's damage and decided upon a plan that would enable the Pennsylvania State Game Commission to purchase seven thousand acres of the land, four thousand of which had been part of the acid factory's plant complex and three thousand that were "situated several miles northeast of the Riefler estate." Contained within the property boundaries were two lakes "regarded as a paradise by anglers," that were known for their stocks of smallmouth bass, pickerel and panfish. The lands were later opened to the general public as a preserve for fishing and other recreational activities. The process was finalized on June 7, 1939 as "State game lands No. 159," becoming "one of the single largest tracts of game land purchased for the sportsmen" of the state. Much of the land included in the preserve was heavily wooded and home to deer, rabbits and ruffed grouse, Pennsylvania's state bird, as well as roughly twelve miles of "ideal trout streams," ponds and a marsh. The purchase of the land was funded by the diversion of seventy-five cents of every annual hunting license sold.

The village, which had gradually withered and died after the acid factory's demise, became a ghost town by the early 1940s. In an effort to save the town, Robert C. Perkins of Honesdale purchased the entire village from the Tanners Falls Development Company in 1941. Seven years later, Perkins auctioned off the village, which was described by newspapers that year as a hamlet, in a sale that included a "factory, store, houses and stable." Notices of the pending sale were placed in newspapers across the United States and as far away as Canada.

In 1952, Edwin Patrick Kilroe, a native of Tanners Falls, donated his family's former homestead and land to the Society of Priests of the Sacred Heart for the priests' use in establishing a seminary there. The Kilroe Seminary of the Congregation of the Priests of the Sacred Heart was dedicated on June 18, 1955 as part of the Roman Catholic Diocese of Scranton.

== Roads and intersections ==
Tanners Falls is centered on the intersection of Upper Woods Road (Pennsylvania Route 4007, or PA-4007) and Tanners Falls Road (part of PA-4017). Six more state routes also run through the village: Hancock Highway (part of PA-191); Bethany Turnpike (part of PA-670); Beech Grove Road (PA-4005); Niles Pond Road (PA-4019), which connects to Hancock; Egypt Drive; and Egypt Road. The last two are part of the aforementioned PA-4017; the latter connects to Tanners Falls and the former connects to the former. All of these roads are paved.

There also eight township roads in Tanners Falls. Six of them are entirely within the village: Lupyak Road (Township Road 451, or T451); Bryant Road (T461), which connects to Upper Woods; Pleasant Valley Road (T463); Alden Road (T544), which connects to both Beech Grove and Lupyak; Haines School Road (T546), which connects to Bethany and Beech Grove; and Kilroe Road (T554), which connects to just Bethany. The other two have sections in other villages: Town Hill Road (T437), which connects to Beech Grove, and Rosehill Road (T467), which connects to Niles Pond. Like many township roads in the state, Lupyak, Bryant, Pleasant Valley, Alden, Haines School, Kilroe, Town Hill, and Rosehill are all unpaved.

Finally, there are fourteen officially-named (i.e., their names may be used in addresses) private roads in the community, thirteen of which fall entirely within its boundaries: Breidenstein Park, which connects to Beech Grove; Cabin Corner, which connects to Haines School; Dyberry Drive, which connects to Bethany; Fairview Drive, which connects to Dyberry; Hidden Lane; Lakeview Drive, which connects to Alden and Hidden; Laurel Drive; Meadow Drive, which connects to Dyberry; Ponderosa Drive, which connects to Alden and Laurel; Skidmore Road, which connects to Bethany; Tighe Lane, which connects to Haines School; Vasko Drive, which connects to Laurel and Ponderosa; and Yellow Brick Road, which connects to Lakeview. The last one, Alden Lake Road, contains sections in other villages, and connects to just Alden. All of these are unpaved.
