= Emma May Buckingham =

American writer and educator

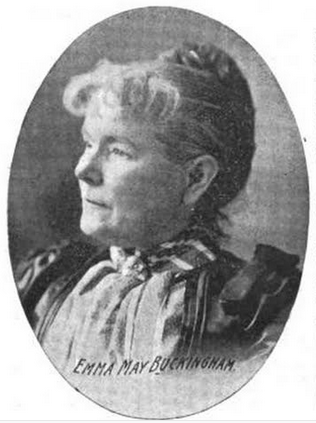
- Buckingham in a 1907 publication
- Born: November 17, 1836; Paupack Township, Pennsylvania, U.S.
- Died: November 8, 1919 (aged 82); Scranton, Pennsylvania, U.S.
- Education: Wyoming Seminary
- Occupations: Writer, educator
- Writing career
- Genres: Novels, poetry, short stories
- Notable works: A Self-Made Woman; Modern Ghost Stories

Emma May Buckingham (November 17, 1836 – November 8, 1919) was an American writer and educator.

== Early life ==
Emma May (or in some sources, Mary Emma) Buckingham was born into the large farming family of Ambrose Whittlesey Buckingham and Mahala Kellee Buckingham, in Paupack Township, Pennsylvania. She trained as a teacher at Wyoming Seminary, near Wilkes-Barre, Pennsylvania.

== Career ==
Buckingham taught school in Scranton, Hazleton, and Honesdale, Pennsylvania, and was principal at a school in Westbrook, Connecticut. Poor health disrupted her employment; "'over-much study' prostrated a delicate organism, and failing health induced her to resign her place," according to one account. She wrote articles for teachers' journals, including "Aesthetic Culture", "Music in Taste-Culture", and "Eye and Hand Culture", all in Pennsylvania School Journal.

Buckingham is known for her first book, A Self-Made Woman: or, Mary Idyl’s Trials and Triumphs (1873), a novel in which the main character is a "sickly" woman writer, nurse, and teacher, who is disowned by her father for pursuing an education and a career. The novel was a success through at least three editions. Further published works by Buckingham included Pearl: A Centennial Poem (1877), The Silver Chalice, and Other Poems (1878), Parson Thorne's Trial, a Novel (1880), Modern Ghost Stories (1906), and His Second Love (1907).

== Personal life ==
Buckingham lived in Honesdale and Hamlin, Wayne County, Pennsylvania as an adult, caring for her mother until her mother died in 1904. She was a member of the Honesdale Presbyterian Church, and active in the local chapter of the Women's Christian Temperance Union (WCTU), and other temperance events. The women of Hamlin gave a surprise party for Buckingham's birthday in 1913. She died at the "Home for the Friendless" in Scranton in 1919, a few days before her 83rd birthday.
