= West Branch Dyberry Creek =

River in Wayne County, Pennsylvania

Coordinates: 41.72232°N 75.33050°W

West Branch Dyberry Creek is a tributary of Dyberry Creek in Wayne County, Pennsylvania in the United States. The most famous or recognizable feature of the creek is Tanners Falls, a large and swift moving waterfall.

== Fishing ==
The Pennsylvania Fish and Boat Commission stocks West Branch Dyberry Creek with trout. The creek is slower than that of the Dyberry Creek's east branch, and it consists of large, deep pools and is quite wide. All types of fishing are permitted on the creek with spinner fishing being the most popular, followed by fly fishing. Two hot-spots for trout fishing are the pools before and following the waterfall.

== See also ==
- List of rivers of Pennsylvania
