= Honesdale Residential Historic District =

Historic district in Pennsylvania, United States

- U.S. National Register of Historic Places
- U.S. Historic district
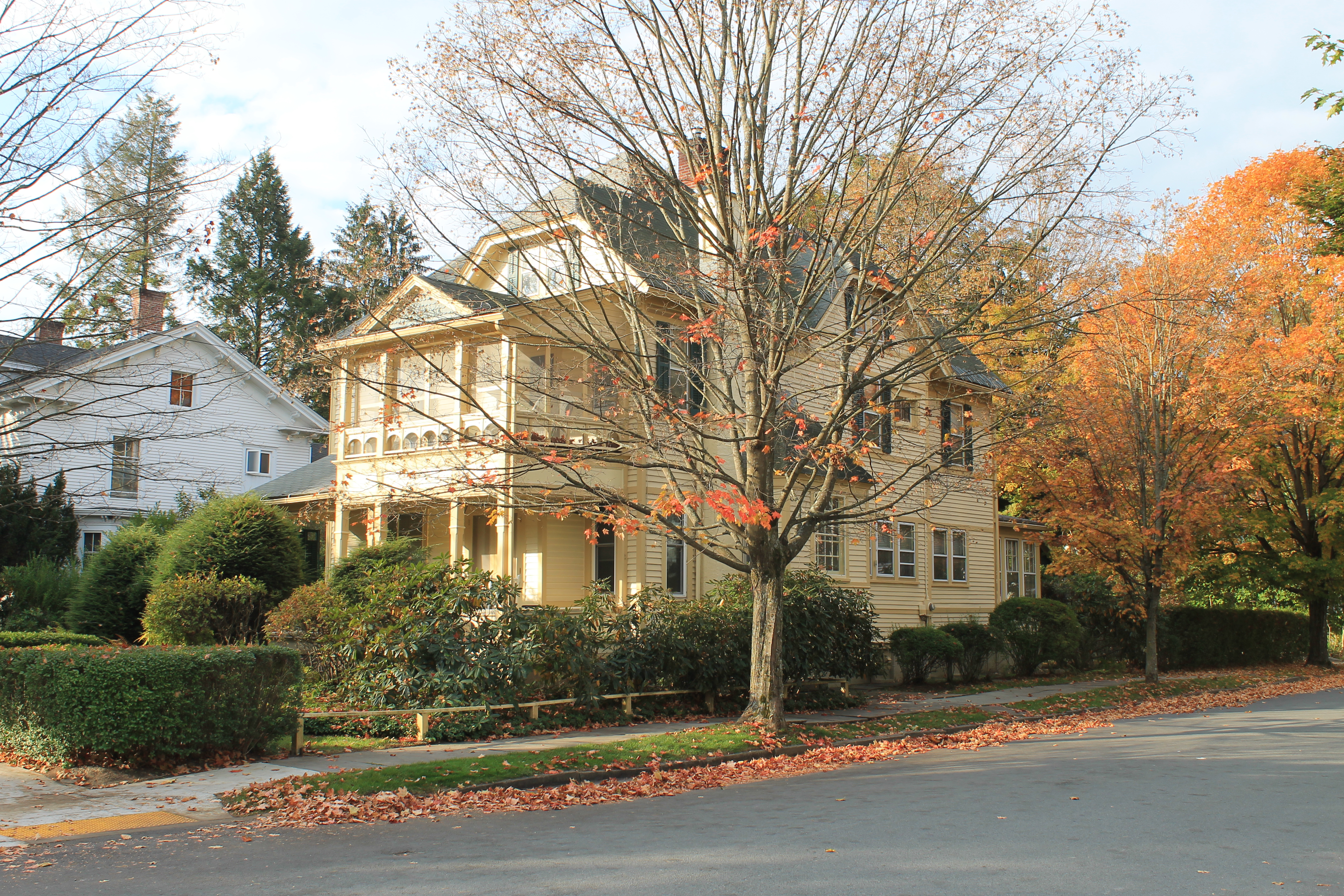

- Location within Pennsylvania Location within the United States
- Location: Roughly bounded by Lackawaxen R., Dyberry Cr. and Dyberry Cemetery, Overlook and 18th Sts., Honesdale, Pennsylvania
- Coordinates: 41°34′51″N 75°15′35″W
- Area: 97 acres (39 ha)
- Architect: Kreitner, William & Frederick; Beers, Elias T., et al.
- Architectural style: Queen Anne, Italianate
- NRHP reference No.: 97001670
- Added to NRHP: February 6, 1998

The Honesdale Residential Historic District, is a national historic district which is located in Honesdale, Wayne County, Pennsylvania.

It was added to the National Register of Historic Places in 1997.

== History and architectural features ==
This district includes 289 contributing buildings and five contributing sites that are situated in a predominantly residential neighborhood of Honesdale. The residences were built between 1830 and 1940, in a variety of popular architectural styles including Greek Revival, Italianate, Bungalow/American Craftsman, Colonial Revival, Second Empire, Queen Anne. The larger homes are typically 2 1/2-story, wood-frame dwellings with hipped and gable roofs.

The district also includes some former factories, such as the Irving Cut Glass Co. and Honesdale Show Company, as well as a former armory. The contributing sites consist of four cemeteries and Riverside Park.

== Gallery ==
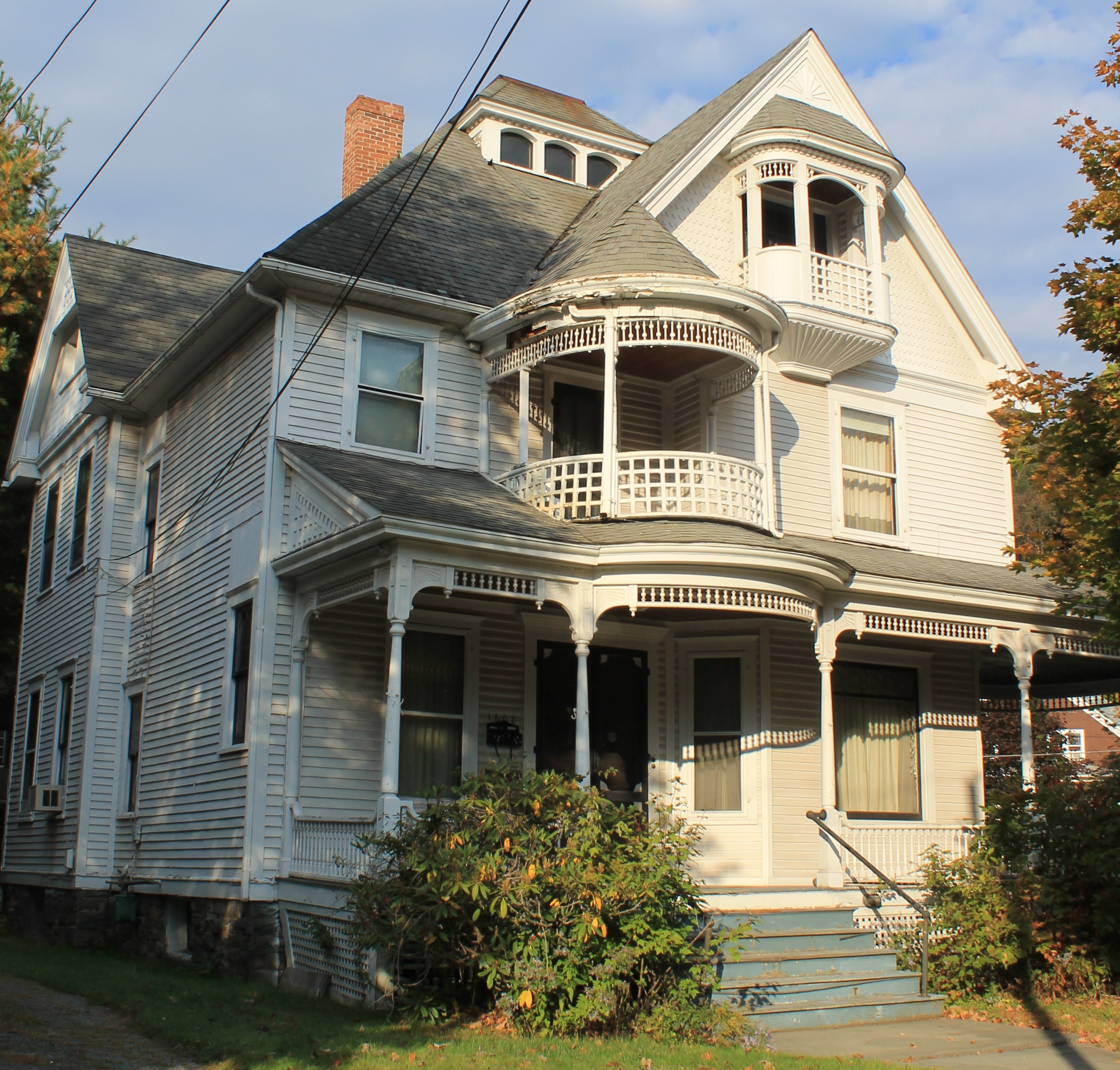

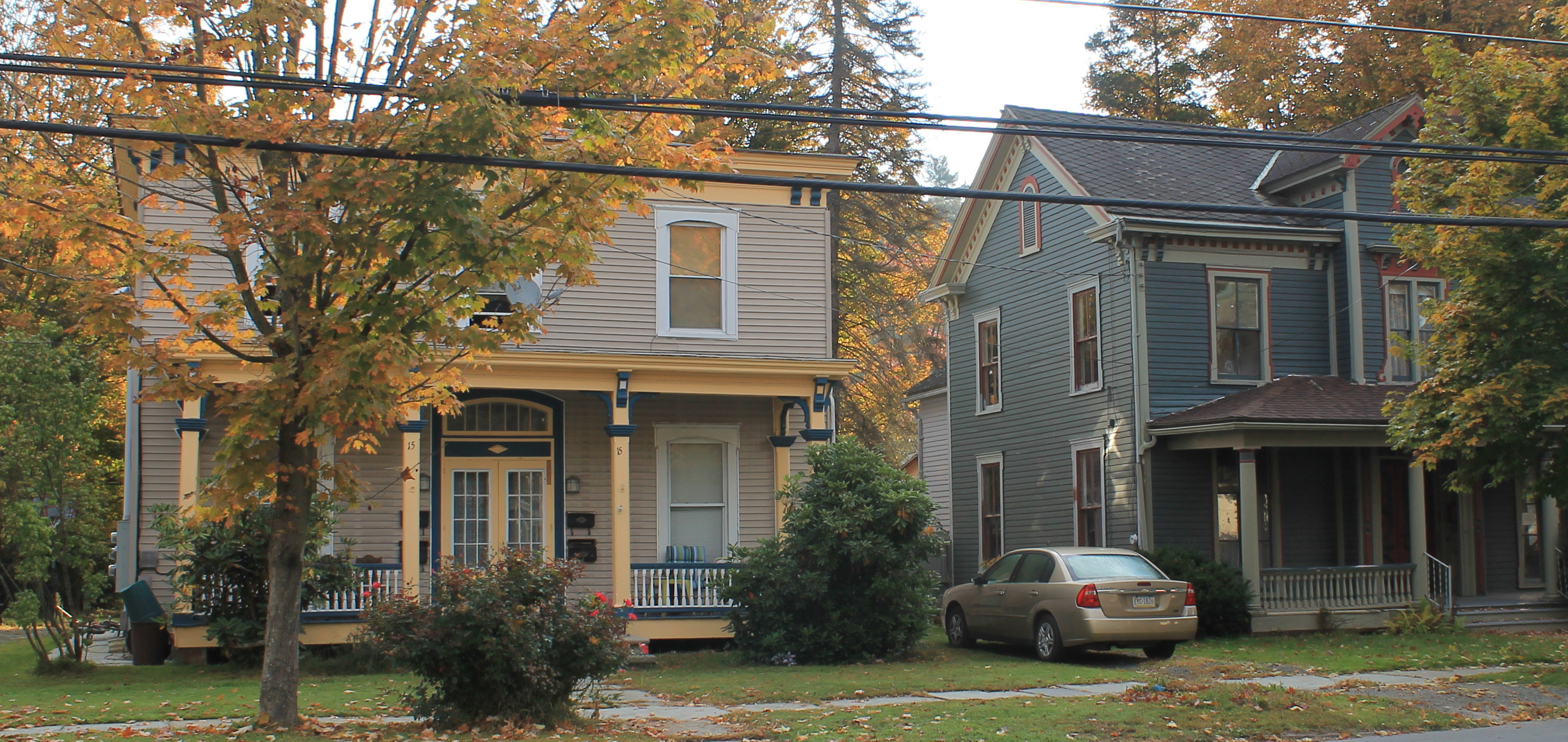
