= Sukanya Roy =

Indian-American spelling bee contestant

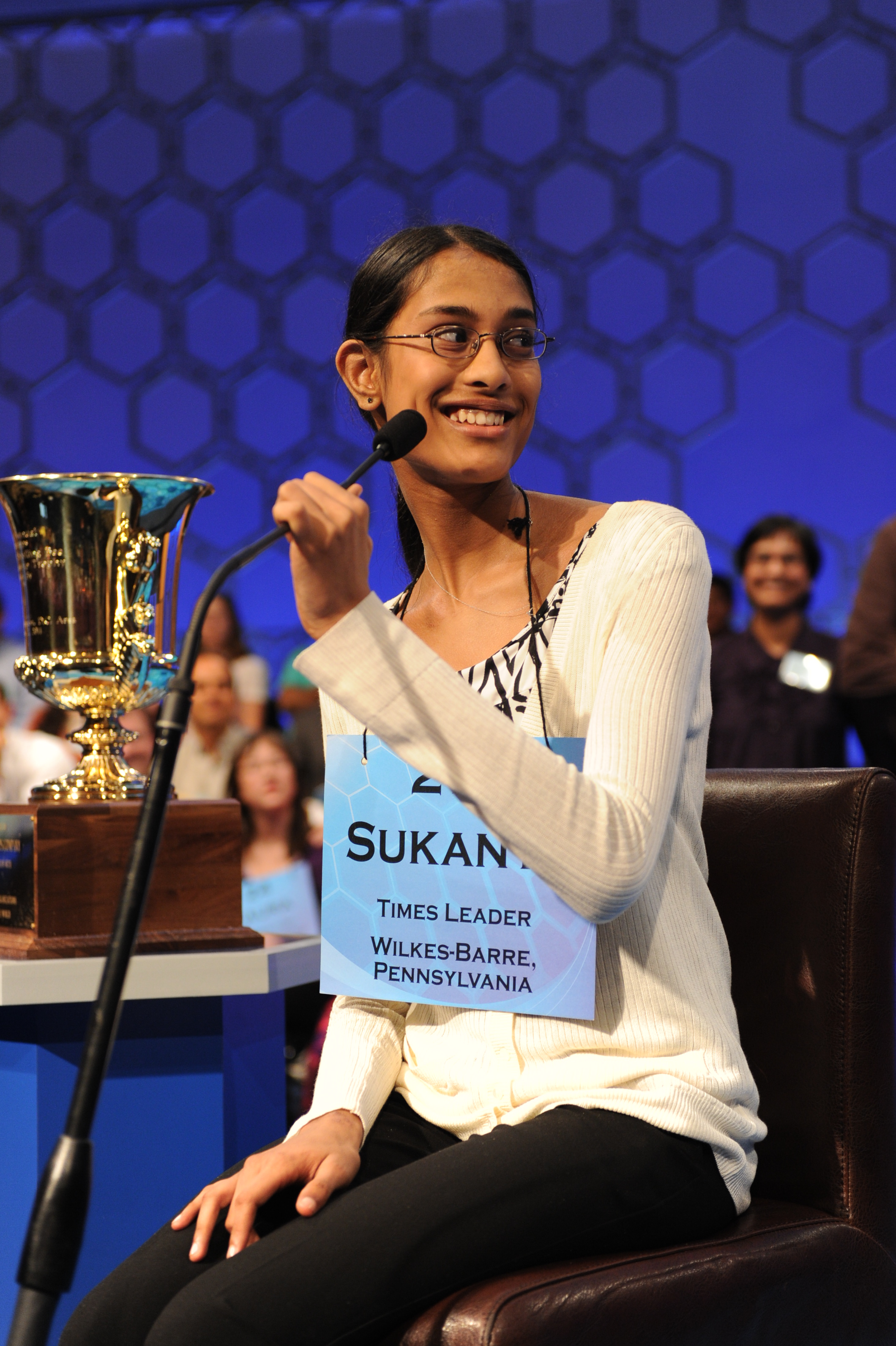
- Citizenship: United States
- Years active: 2009-2011
- Known for: Winning the 84th Scripps National Spelling Bee
- Title: Champion of the Scripps National Spelling Bee
- Predecessor: Anamika Veeramani
- Successor: Snigdha Nandipati

Sukanya Roy is an Indian-American spelling bee contestant known for winning the 84th Scripps National Spelling Bee.

She first took part in the Scripps National Spelling Bee during the competition's 82nd edition in 2009, where she was ranked 12th place. She also took part at the 83rd Scripps National Spelling Bee in 2010, placing 20th.

In 2011, at the age of 14, Sukanya won first place at the 84th Scripps National Spelling Bee, after having correctly guessed the spelling of the word 'cymotrichous' during the 20th round. During the course of the competition, she was sponsored by the Times Leader of Wilkes-Barre, Pennsylvania. She was awarded approximately $40,000 in cash and prizes for her performance at the competition.

She became the fourth consecutive Indian-American to win the Spelling Bee, and the ninth Indian-American winner since 1999.

During the time when Sukanya took part at the 2011 Scripps National Spelling Bee, she was studying in the eighth grade at the Abington Heights Middle School in Newton Ransom, Pennsylvania.

She hailed from South Abington Township, Pennsylvania. She pursued her passion in hiking, rock climbing and ice skating while also expecting to pursue her career in the field of international relations. She also claimed a prize in an individual section of the northeast Pennsylvania Chapter Mathcounts Competition in 2011.
