= Honesdale Star Park =

Park in Honesdale, Pennsylvania with a 30-foot star in the center

Coordinates: 41.579120°N 75.251653°W

Gibbons Memorial Park, also known as Honesdale Star Park, is a park in Honesdale, Pennsylvania with a 30-foot (9.1 m) star in the center.

== The park ==
The park is dedicated as a memorial to a past mayor, Austin Flint Gibbons, and to his parents Dr. and Mrs. Peter S. Gibbons. The actual park that the star is in lies at the top of a winding wooded road. A local paper reported in November 1956: "The Christmas star has been placed on its frame in Gibbons Memorial Park, Irving Cliff. It will be lighted Thanksgiving Eve, Nov. 21." Perched on top of Irving Cliff, the highest mountain overlooking the town, the park is surrounded by a large fence that wraps around the premises.

== Lent and Easter ==
During the 40 days leading up to Easter, otherwise known as Lent, the star that watches the town disappears and is replaced by another image. A towering Christian cross is instead displayed over the town.

The cross has been permanently removed due to a First Amendment challenge.
