= Dyberry Township, Wayne County, Pennsylvania =

Township in Pennsylvania, US

Dyberry, Pennsylvania
- Second-class township
- Township of Dyberry
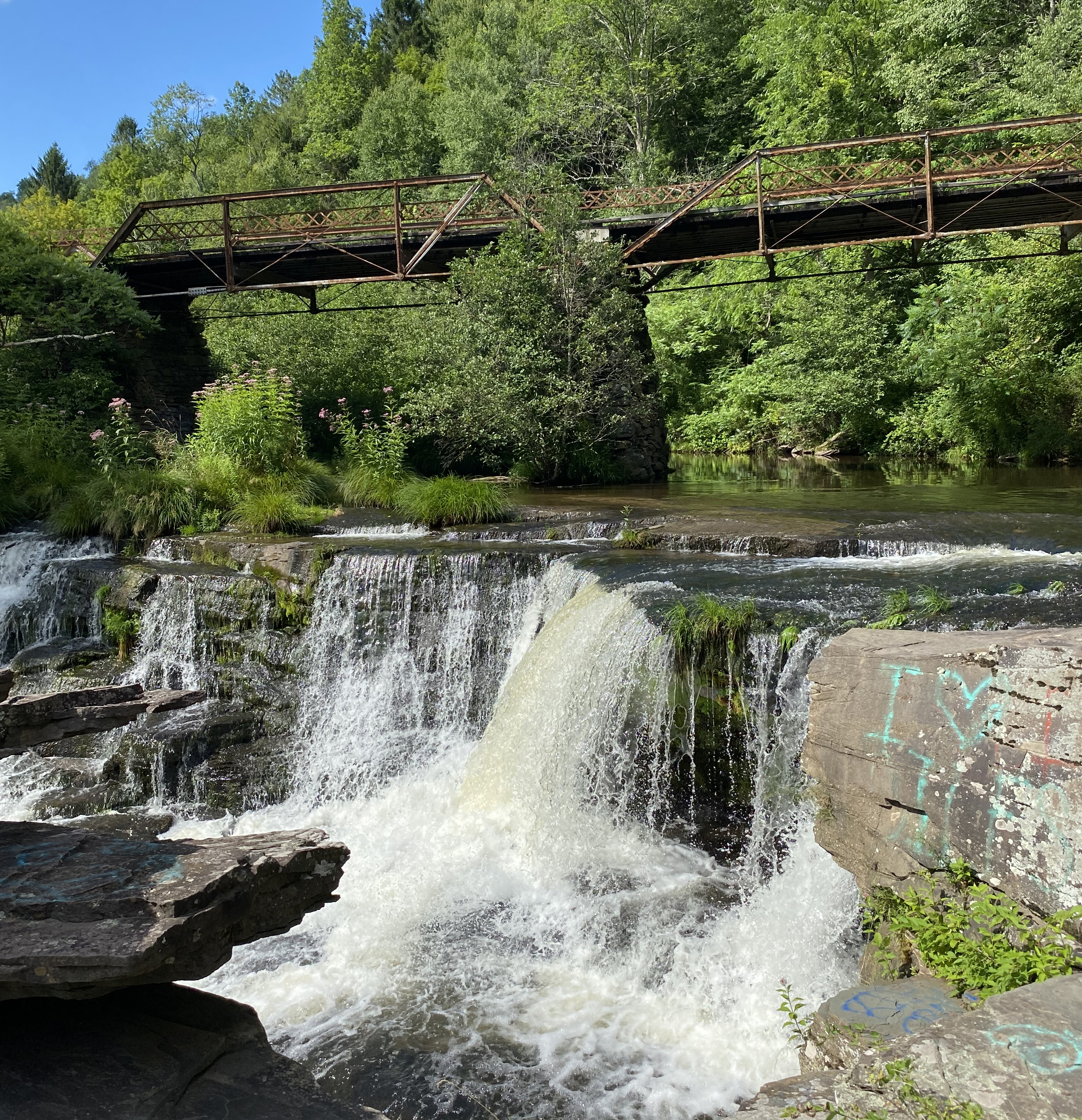
- Confluence of the East and West Branches of the Dyberry Creek, in Tanners Falls.

- Location in Wayne County and the state of Pennsylvania.
- Country: United States
- State: Pennsylvania
- US Congressional District: PA-8
- State Senatorial District: 20
- State House of Representatives District: 139
- County: Wayne
- School District: Wayne Highlands; Region II
- Settled: c. 1797
- Incorporated: c. 1804
- Founded by: John Kizer
- Named after: Dyberry Creek

Government
  - Type: Board of Supervisors
  - Board of Supervisors: Supervisors: Kevin P. McGinnis; Bruce A. Varcoe; John Walker
  - US Representative: Matt Cartwright (D)
  - State Senator: Lisa Baker (R)
  - State Representative: Michael Peifer (R)

Area
  - Total: 22.90 sq mi (59.30 km^{2})
  - Land: 22.17 sq mi (57.42 km^{2})
  - Water: 0.73 sq mi (1.88 km^{2})
- Elevation: 1,510 ft (460 m)

Population (2020)
  - Total: 1,397
  - Density: 63.0/sq mi (24.33/km^{2})
- Time zone: UTC-5 (Eastern (EST))
  - Summer (DST): UTC-4 (Eastern Daylight (EDT))
- Area code: 570
- GNIS feature ID: 1217219
- FIPS code: 42-127-20576

Dyberry is a second-class township in Wayne County, Pennsylvania, United States. The township's population was 1,397 at the time of the 2020 United States Census.

== Geography ==
According to the United States Census Bureau, the township has a total area of 22.9 square miles (59 km^{2}), of which 22.2 square miles (57 km^{2}) is land and 0.7 square miles (1.8 km^{2}) (3.18%) is water.

== Communities ==
The following villages are located in Dyberry Township:

- Dyberry
- Tanners Falls (also called Tanner's Falls)

== Demographics ==
Historical population
Census	Pop.	Note	%±
2010	1,401		—
2020	1,397		−0.3%
U.S. Decennial Census

As of the census of 2010, there were 1,401 people, 544 households, and 378 families residing in the township. The population density was 63.1 inhabitants per square mile (24.4/km^{2}). There were 691 housing units at an average density of 31.1 per square mile (12.0/km^{2}). The racial makeup of the township was 97.1% White, 0.5% African American, 0.7% Asian, and 1.6% from two or more races. Hispanic or Latino of any race were 1.5% of the population.

There were 544 households, out of which 25.4% had children under the age of 18 living with them, 57.7% were married couples living together, 7.4% had a female householder with no husband present, and 30.5% were non-families. 24.8% of all households were made up of individuals, and 10.9% had someone living alone who was 65 years of age or older. The average household size was 2.38 and the average family size was 2.82.

In the township the population was spread out, with 18.7% under the age of 18, 65.3% from 18 to 64, and 16% who were 65 years of age or older. The median age was 46.7 years.

The median income for a household in the township was $47,463, and the median income for a family was $60,556. Males had a median income of $33,056 versus $23,782 for females. The per capita income for the township was $21,428. About 1% of families and 23.4% of the population were below the poverty line, including 3.3% of those under age 18 and 8.9% of those age 65 or over.
