= Camp Watonka =

Summer camp for boys in Pennsylvania, US

Coordinates: 41.490063°N 75.241477°W

Camp Watonka was a residential summer camp for boys aged seven to sixteen in Wayne County, Pennsylvania, from 1963 to 2019. It was the only science camp for boys accredited by the American Camp Association in the United States. Accommodation was in traditional cabins with modern bathrooms and electricity. Campers could stay for two, four, six or eight weeks.

It was one of many summer camps in The Poconos. Field trips to the Appalachian Trail for hiking and mountain biking and to the Delaware River for tubing and kayaking were scheduled each summer.

The former site of the camp has been repurposed as an outdoor facility called Watonka Outdoor. Science is not a focus of the new venture.

== Location ==
Camp Watonka was located 3 miles (4.8 km) from Hawley, ten miles (16 km) from Honesdale and 100 miles (160 km) New York City. Many campers were from the tri-state region but others traveled from all over the United States and the World.

Several of Northeastern Pennsylvania’s historic gravity railroads used to pass through the camp, transporting anthracite coal over the Moosic Mountains from Scranton to Hawley. Two of the former railroad beds (those of the Erie Railroad and Pennsylvania Coal Company) were used as mountain bike and dirt bike trails. The third has been converted to a road. Middle Creek flowed through the camp and into the Lackawaxen River in Hawley.

During the summer of 2006, all campers and staff left the camp for three nights as a precautionary measure due to a sudden rise in the level of Middle Creek, caused by a week of heavy rain.

The camp was less than a mile from Wangum Falls. A distinctive monocline can be seen from the historic truss bridge that crosses Middle Creek about twenty feet above the Falls.

== Activities and facilities ==
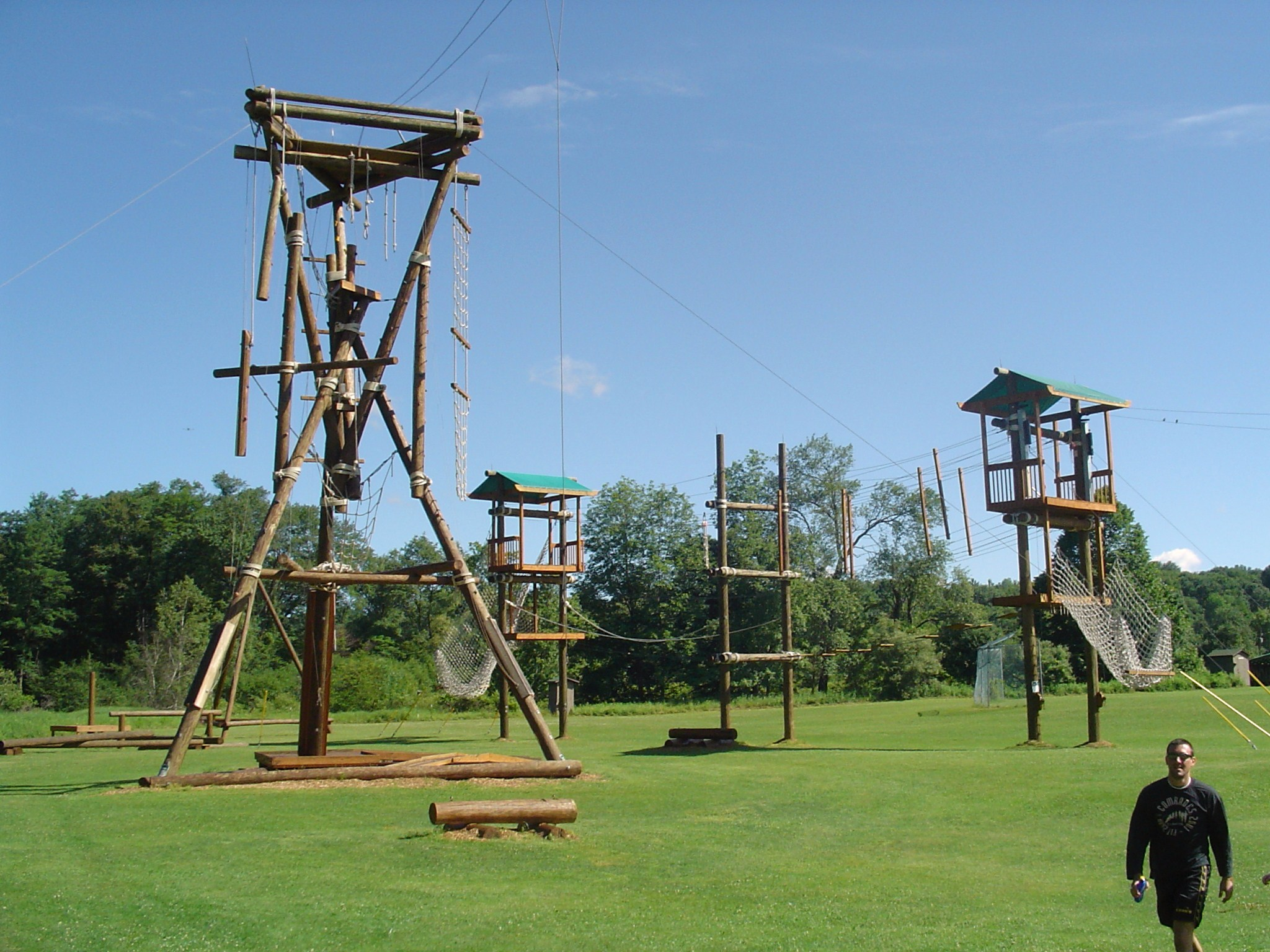
The Alpine Tower and the Odyssey at Camp Watonka's Ropes Course

Each day at Camp Watonka was split into 5 activity periods, two in the morning, two in the afternoon and one in the evening. The schedule was fully elective. At the start of each two week session, campers choose which science classes they wanted to take, often selecting one or two. Counselor-to-camper ratios were typically one-to-four.

Camp Watonka had eleven purpose built and equipped cabins for its science program. There were laboratories for chemistry and physics, a nature cabin, with facilities for a variety of animals that are brought to camp by counselors and instructors, and two computer suites. Campers developed photos in one of the darkrooms and directed and edited their own film in the video production class. Other science classes included electronics, robotics, astronomy and earth science. Experienced instructors and counselors delivered classes in their specialist subjects, including architecture, renewable energy, automotive design and quantum mechanics.

In addition to the camp’s science program, there were facilities for many other sports and activities. Camp Watonka had a large ropes course facility, designed and built by Alpine Towers International. The 50' climbing wall (Carolina Straight Wall), built in 2001, had six faces with varying degrees of difficulty. The 50' tower (Alpine Tower II), built in 2001, had six routes to the top and various obstacles to tackle, including cargo nets and hanging logs. A swing was suspended between the tower and an adjacent support. Riders are attached to the swing, hoisted diagonally and then released to swing back and forth like a pendulum.

The camp was accredited by the National Rifle Association of America. Campers practiced shooting rifles and pistols on the 50’ range as well as trap shooting. Archery was offered as well, under the direction of a USA Archery-certified instructor.

Campers learned how to swim, canoe, kayak, row, sail and windsurf at the camp’s private, spring-fed lake. Swim instructors deliver optional American Red Cross classes. Campers can also try to climb the inflatable iceberg, relax on the beach or float around on one of the inflatable tubes.

Camp Watonka had two tennis courts, a basketball court, a hockey court, a volleyball court, a softball field and a soccer field. The camp had ten mountain bikes of various sizes to accommodate campers of all ages. Other activities include arts and crafts, woodwork and rocketry.

== Staff ==
Camp Watonka was owned and directed by Donald Wacker, a retired science teacher from New Jersey and leader with the Boy Scouts of America, and his wife, a nurse, since its founding in 1963. The Wackers operated the Camp with the assistance of their son and daughter-in-law, both school teachers in Wayne County.
