= Lorna Breen =

American physician (1970–2020)

- Born: Lorna Margaret Breen; October 9, 1970; Charlottesville, Virginia, United States
- Died: April 26, 2020 (aged 49); Charlottesville, Virginia
- Occupation: Physician

Lorna Margaret Breen (October 9, 1970 – April 26, 2020) was an American physician who was the emergency room director at NewYork-Presbyterian Hospital. She died by suicide in 2020, while taking a break with family in Charlottesville, Virginia during the coronavirus pandemic.

== Early life ==
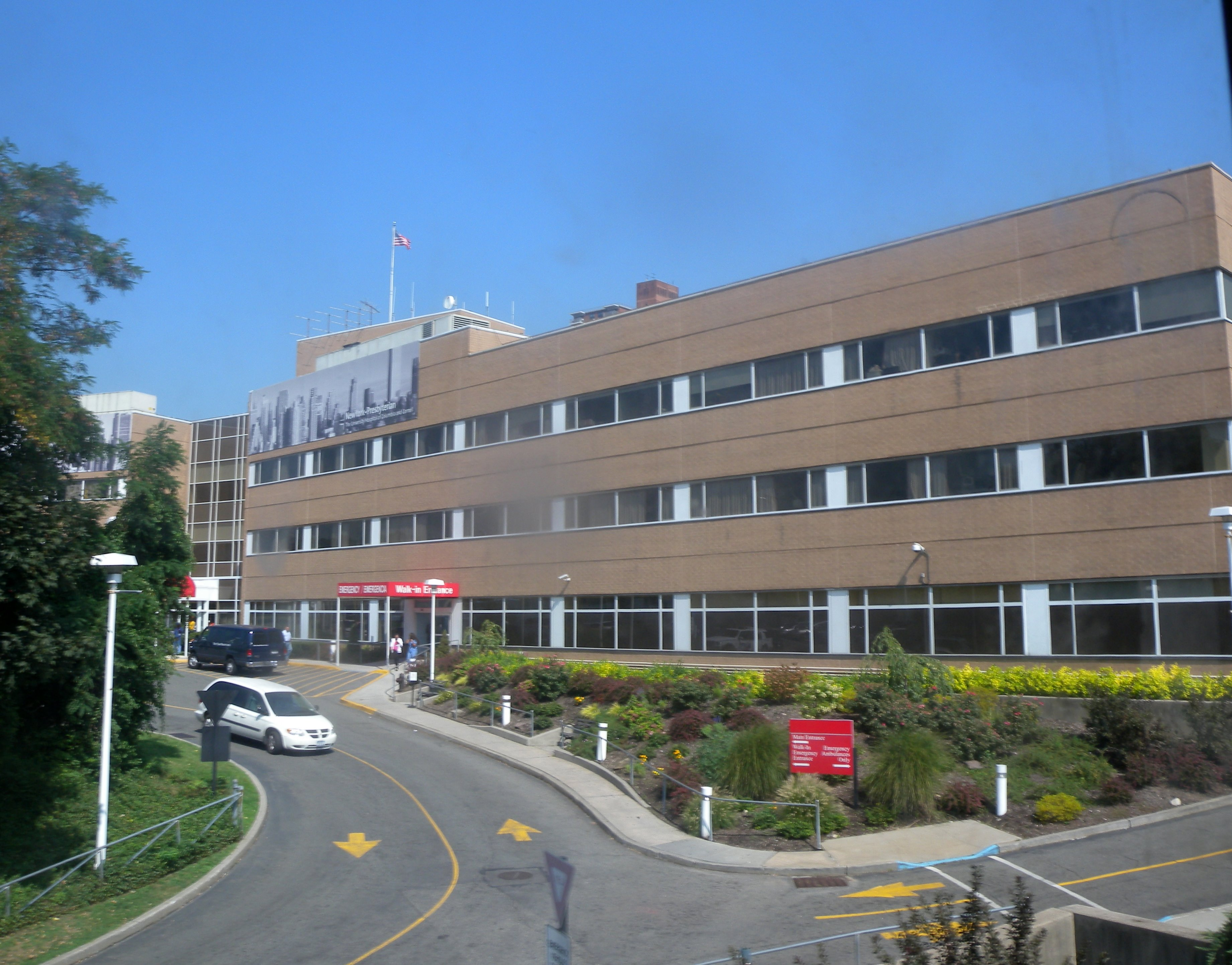
NewYork-Presbyterian Allen hospital where Lorna Breen worked

Breen was born in Charlottesville, Virginia, and raised in Danville, Pennsylvania. She graduated from Wyoming Seminary in 1988. She received a master's degree at Cornell University and attended Medical College of Virginia before doing a residency at Long Island Jewish Medical Center.

== Career ==
Breen worked in The Allen Hospital at the NewYork-Presbyterian, where during spring of 2020 she treated patients with COVID-19. She contracted the virus herself then went back to work after isolating for a week and a half. On a family break in Charlottesville, Virginia, she died by suicide on April 26, 2020.

Her father said: "She was truly in the trenches of the frontline. She tried to do her job, and it killed her [...] Make sure she’s praised as a hero. Because she was, she’s a casualty just as much as anyone else who has died."

== Selected works ==
- Breen, Lorna M. (1 September 1999). "What Should I Do If My Patient Does Not Speak English?". JAMA. 282 (9): 819. doi:10.1001/jama.282.9.819-JMS0901-3-1. PMID 10478684.
- Chang, Bernard P.; Cato, Kenrick Dwain; Cassai, Mary; Breen, Lorna (November 2019). "Clinician burnout and its association with team based care in the Emergency Department". The American Journal of Emergency Medicine. 37 (11): 2113–2114. doi:10.1016/j.ajem.2019.06.032. PMC 6917942. PMID 31255426.
- Brener, Michael I.; Tung, Jen; Stant, Jennifer; Sayan, Osman R.; Suh, Edward H.; Minutello, Robert M.; Sharma, Rahul; Brener, Sorin J.; Melniker, Lawrence A.; Moustakakis, Emmanuel N.; Neuberg, Gerald; Breen, Lorna M.; Nutovits, Ronald; Kats, Yuliya; Amaranto, Andrew; Pucillo, Anthony; Kirtane, Ajay J.; Rabbani, LeRoy E. (December 2019). "An Updated Healthcare System-Wide Clinical Pathway for Managing Patients With Chest Pain and Acute Coronary Syndromes". Critical Pathways in Cardiology. 18 (4): 167–175. doi:10.1097/HPC.0000000000000189. PMID 31725507. S2CID 208036312.
