= Cecilia Galante =

American author

- Born: Mount Hope Commune, New York
- Education: King's College (BA); Goddard College (MFA)
- Occupations: Writer; college instructor; middle-high school English teacher
- Employer(s): Wyoming Seminary Preparatory School, Wilkes University
- Known for: Author, Former Child and Teen Commune Resident
- Notable work: The Patron Saint of Butterflies
- Style: Young Adult and Adult fiction
- Spouse: Paul Galante
- Parents: Joe Plummer (father); Terry Plummer (mother)
- Website: http://www.ceciliagalanteauthor.com/

Cecilia (Plummer) Galante is a twenty-first century American author.

== Background ==
Galante has a BA from King's College in Pennsylvania, and an MFA in creative writing from Goddard College in Vermont. Prior to becoming a successful author, she taught high school English and wrote a monthly book column for the Times Leader newspaper. In 2011, at a fundraising event for St. Martin's Ministry (an outreach to poor and homeless people on Maryland's Eastern Shore run by the Benedictine Sisters and Volunteers at St. Gertrude's Monastery in Ridgely, Maryland), Ms. Galante revealed that she was "once a needy mother with an infant daughter in a battered women’s shelter.”

== Publications ==
=== The Patron Saint of Butterflies ===
Her first book, The Patron Saint of Butterflies published in April 2008, is an acclaimed, allusion of the life experiences of children raised at the Mount Hope religious commune in New York under the auspices of scholar, philosopher, and cult leader Herbert T. Schwartz. Cecelia Galante, herself, was born and raised at Mount Hope religious commune for the first fifteen years of her life during the mid-twentieth century. She lived there with her parents, Terry and Joe Plummer, as well as her seven other siblings, of whom she is the eldest. After the Plummer family left the commune, they settled in Wilkes-Barre, Pennsylvania where Cecilia attended High School.

=== Other books ===
- Hershey Herself, December 2008
- The Sweetness of Salt, November 2010
- Willowood, March 2011
- Little Wings #1: Willa Bean's Cloud Dreams (A Stepping Stone Book(TM)), December 2011
- Little Wings #2: Be Brave, Willa Bean! (A Stepping Stone Book(TM)), December 2011
- The Summer of May, April 2012
- Little Wings #3: Star-Bubble Trouble (A Stepping Stone Book(TM)), May 2012
- Little Wings #4: The One and Only Willa Bean (A Stepping Stone Book(TM)), December 2012
- Little Wings #5: Willa Bean to the Rescue! (A Stepping Stone Book(TM)), July 2013
- Little Wings #6: Cupid Crush (A Stepping Stone Book(TM)), December 2013
- Be Not Afraid, April 2015
- The Invisibles, August 2015
- The World from Up Here, June 2016
- ”The Odds of You and Me”, 2017
- "Strays like us", 2018

Galante's 6-volume series of chapter books for young readers, titled Little Wings, was translated into Turkish and Japanese.

== Personal ==
Cecilia Galante has three children as well as "a very lazy cat named Julius." When she is not writing, Galante teaches creative writing as a faculty member of the Graduate Creative Writing Department at Wilkes University. She lives in Kingston, Pennsylvania and teaches English at a private school for 8th grade.

== National press ==
As part of a "Banned Book Books Week" series in The Huffington Post, in 2011, Ms. Galante was given the opportunity to explain why it was important that The Patron Saint of Butterflies was banned from some libraries. In July 2012, The Washington Post interviewed Ms. Galante and described her book, The Summer of May, as a book that is "as refreshing as a cool summer breeze."
