= 84th Scripps National Spelling Bee =

Spelling bee held in the United States in 2011

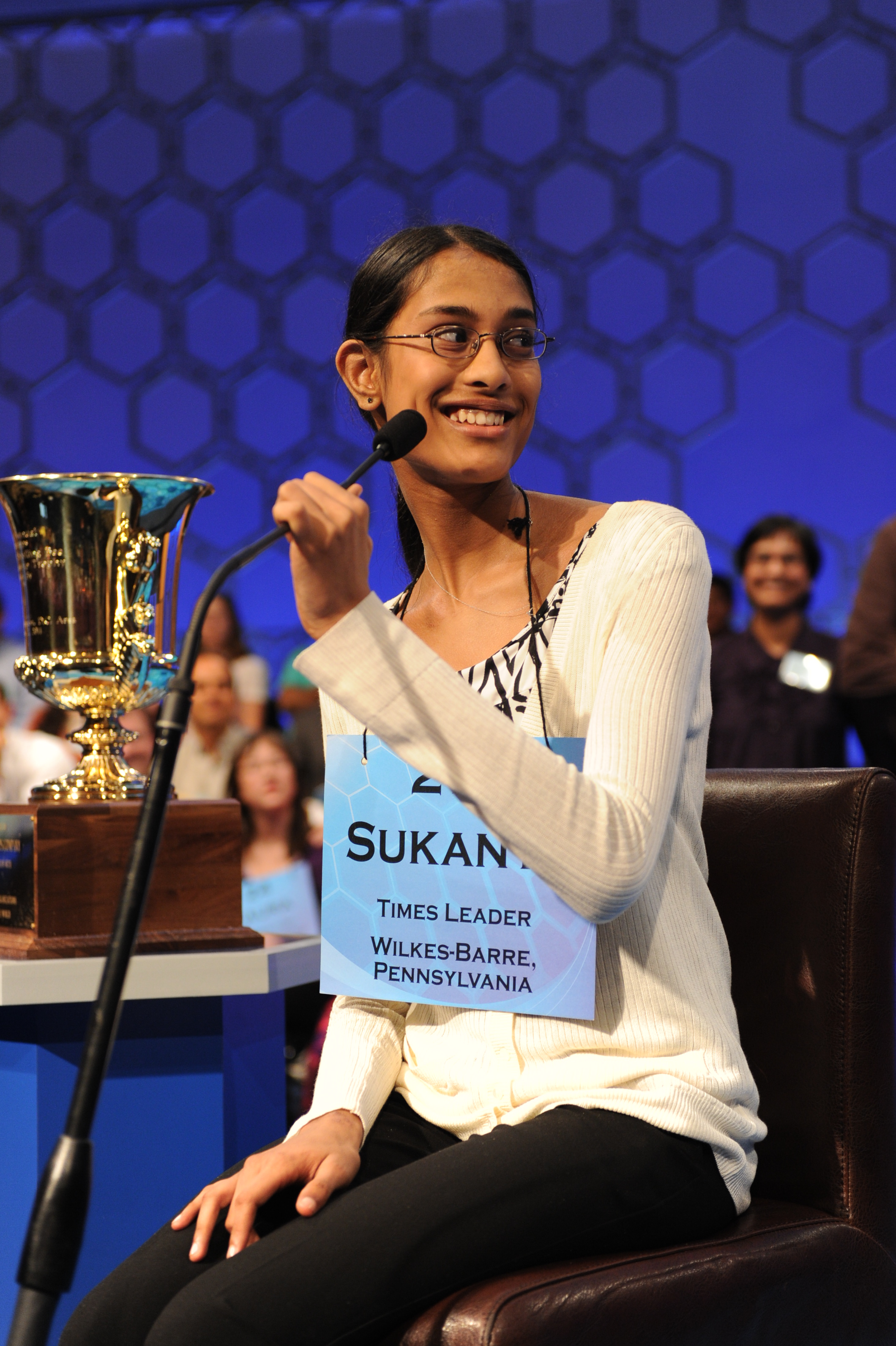
- Sukanya Roy, Champion of the 2011 Scripps National Spelling Bee
- Date: May 31 – June 2, 2011
- Location: Gaylord National Resort & Convention Center, National Harbor, Maryland
- Winner: Sukanya Roy (14 at time of win)
- Sponsor: Times Leader
- Sponsor location: Wilkes-Barre, Pennsylvania
- Winning word: cymotrichous
- No. of contestants: 275
- Pronouncer: Jacques Bailly

The 84th Scripps National Spelling Bee was held from May 31 – June 2, 2011 at the Gaylord National Resort & Convention Center in Oxon Hill, Maryland near Washington, D.C. The champion was 14-year-old Sukanya Roy, who was the ninth Indian-American champion in the past thirteen competitions.

== Competition ==
- The Bee included 275 spelling champions hailing from all 50 U.S. states as well as American Samoa, Guam, Puerto Rico, the U.S. Virgin Islands, the Bahamas, Canada, China, Ghana, Jamaica, Japan, New Zealand, South Korea, and U.S. Department of Defense Schools in Europe.
- Two championship finalists from 2010 returned to participate in this Bee; Joanna Ye of Pennsylvania and Laura Newcombe of Ontario, Canada.
- This year was the seventh time the champion has come from Pennsylvania.
- This was the fourth year in a row than an Indian-American won the competition.
- During the last rounds of the final five spellers, 20 words were spelled correctly. This is the equivalent of 4 full competition rounds with no incorrectly spelled words.
- This year, the Bee also lasted approximately 3 full hours, 1.5 hours more than the originally scheduled length.
- This was the first year that the Bee was held outside the city limits of Washington, D.C., moving from the Grand Hyatt Washington where it had been held for 15 years, to the Gaylord National Resort & Convention Center.

== Top finishers ==
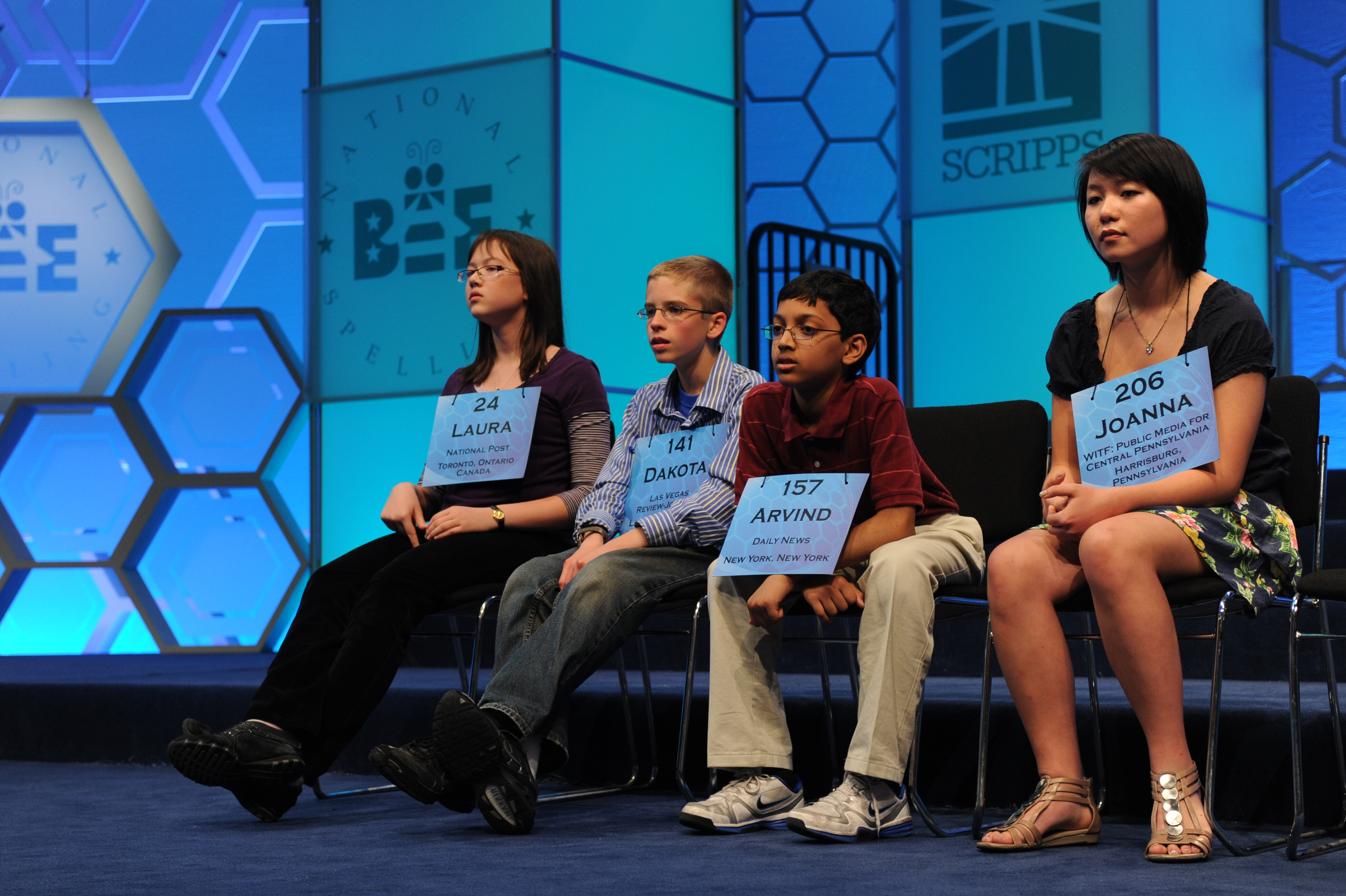
From left to right: Laura Newcombe, Dakota Jones, Arvind Mahankali and Joanna Ye.

- Sukanya Roy, of South Abington Township, Lackawanna County, Pennsylvania, representing the Times Leader of Wilkes-Barre, Pennsylvania, won the competition by spelling cymotrichous.
- Laura Newcombe, of Toronto, Ontario, was the runner-up. She was eliminated by the word sorites as "psorites".
- Joanna Ye, of Carlisle, Pennsylvania, and Arvind Mahankali, of Forest Hills, New York, tied for third place. Ye was eliminated by the word galoubet as "galubey", while Mahankali misspelled jugendstil as "uguntschtiel". Mahankali made a joke when he got "Jugendstil" as his word, asking for the word to be repeated, and he said "You could steal?" as the word he got, jugendstil, was very similar to that phrase.
- Dakota Jones, of Las Vegas, Nevada, placed fifth; he was eliminated by the word zanja, spelling it as "zangha".
- Veronica Penny, of Rockland, Ontario, Dhivya Senthil Murugan, of Denver, Colorado, Sriram Hathwar, of Painted Post, New York, and Mashad Arora of Brownsville, Texas, tied for sixth place.
- Lily Jordan, of Cape Elizabeth, Maine, Nabeel Rahman, of Buffalo, New York, and Prakash Mishra, of Waxhaw, North Carolina, tied for tenth place.
- Samuel Estep, of Berryville, Virginia, placed thirteenth.

== Word list championship round ==
- rapprochement
- cioppino
- apolaustic
- Cassiopeian
- andouille
- scelidosaur
- exsufflation
- profiterole
- seneschal
- naphthalene
- psephomancy
- teppanyaki
- bondieuserie
- attacca
- eremacausis
- crevecoeur
- phanerogam
- hexafoos
- dockmackie
- dasylirion
- dactyliotheca
- susurrus
- schokker
- pyopoiesis
- psittacines
- ingberlach
- rougeot
- ephelides
- gravicembalo
- polatouche
- epipodiale
- furcocercous
- volkerwanderung
- samiel
- caciocavallo
- zortzico
- uayeb
- capercaillie
- rapakivi
- cheongsam
- sarangousty
- opodeldoc
- karpas
- lakatoi
- huipil
- puszta
- solferino
- keitloa
- zwischenspiel
- pelerine
- haori
- capoeira
- abhinaya
- preux
- bourride
- zanja
- gazoz
- urushiye
- sangsue
- grison
- komatik
- cebell
- lekane
- panguingue
- Jugendstil
- galoubet
- naumkeag
- hooroosh
- orgeat
- sorites
- periscii
- cymotrichous
