= The Patron Saint of Butterflies =

2008 book by Cecilia Galante

- Author: Cecilia Galante
- Language: English
- Genre: Young adult
- Published: 2008 Bloomsbury
- Publication place: United States
- Media type: Print (Hardcover), (Paperback), (Audio CD), (Kindle)
- Pages: 292 (Hardcover), 320 (Paperback)

The Patron Saint of Butterflies is a young-adult novel by author Cecilia Galante. It was first published in 2008.

== Plot ==
Honey and Agnes are best friends growing up in Mount Blessing, a religious commune in Fairfield, Connecticut. Honey and Agnes could not be any more different, and the older they get the more they are growing apart. Honey was abandoned by her mother as a newborn, but she lived in the nursery with Agnes until she turned 7 years old; Honey lives with Winky and Agnes lives with her parents and her brother, Benny. Ever since Agnes got The Saints' Way (The Saints' Way is a book that everyone in Mount Blessing gets when they turn twelve; it is given by the leader Emmanuel), she has changed. Agnes now abides by all the rules in Mount Blessing, and she goes by whatever Emmanuel says. Honey on the other hand, never listens to Emmanuel or Veronica, never follows the rules and hates living at Mount Blessing. Whenever they, or anyone, do something wrong they are sent to the "regulation room". There they get whipped by Emmanuel and Veronica. Everything stays this way until Nana Pete, Agnes' grandmother, shows up unexpectedly and finds out the truth behind Mount Blessing.

== Awards ==
The Patron Saint of Butterflies received the New Atlantic Independent Booksellers (NAIBA) Best Book of the Year award for Children's Literature in 2008; it was also selected as one of Oprah’s Best Teen Selections in 2008. The Patron Saint of Butterflies earned the award for the Young Adult Book of the Year by the Northeast Independent Booksellers Association and was a Top Ten Pick for 2008 by Amazon.com. The novel was selected to be a Book Sense Pick and a Banks Children Book of the Year Selection. It was also a Golden Sower Award Nominee and a Grand Canyon Reader Award Nominee.

== Book Ban ==
In 2011, The Patron Saint of Butterflies was banned from a school in Minnesota. The effect of which was to increase the popularity and visibility of the novel.

== The Author's Basis for the Story ==
The story is a fictionalized account of the little-known religious commune run by Herbert Thomas Schwartz (1903-1980) at Mount Hope in New York in the mid-20th century. Unlike the Mount Blessing community, the Mount Hope religious commune was quite mobile. Schwartz started the community by gathering laypeople around himself in Greenwich Village in the early sixties. The community was housed first in Ramsey, New Jersey, then in Ridgewood, New Jersey, finally moving in 1965 to Mount Hope. After Schwartz died, the commune "headquarters" moved to Milford, Pennsylvania.) One who was an adult at Mount Hope, Laura Mead Jones, describes the author, Cecilia Galante, as a woman who lived the life of the children described in The Patron Saint of Butterflies: "Cecilia Galante was born at Mt. Hope and her book is something of a parody of life as seen through the eyes of many of her generation." In a 2007 post, Laura Jones also wrote that it appeared to her that author Cecilia Galante actually enjoyed Mount Hope, but only changed her views about the religious commune when convinced to do so as an adult by her mother, Terry Plummer. Similarities between Mount Blessing commune and Mount Hope commune are only slightly veiled. The character "Emmanuel" stood for cult-leader Herbert T. Schwartz while the character "Veronica" represented his wife "Charleen". The fictional book, The Saint's Way represents the autobiography of St. Therese of Lisieux which is called The Little Way. Schwartz considered himself to be the official and proper (though never pronounced by any ecclesial authority and thereby self-proclaimed) interpreter of St. Therese's description of her path to holiness.

Many adults who were children at the commune wrote blogs confirming abuse (physical and sexual) by Schwartz at Mount Hope. A private Facebook page was created for survivors to contact one another. Some remaining adults defend Herbert T. Schwartz as a great and holy leader while the grown children are confused and depraved. Then there are some who were there or who knew Schwartz who are non-committal about the whole event. The author of The Patron Saint of Butterflies, Cecilia Galante, reported that it was a place where she was always writing, including early stories "passed down from her father," Tom Plummer.

== Audio Book ==
A nine (9) hour audio version of Patron Saint of Butterflies was produced in 2011.

== Reviews ==
- John Sellers of Publishers Weekly called The Patron Saint of Butterflies "required reading" in February 2008.
- Publishers Weekly described the book as having "ripped from the headlines fascination for readers" in May 2008. (In this review, the author's first name is misspelled and the text is attributed to "Cecelia Galante.")
- Ilene Cooper of Booklist described the climax as "realistic and emotionally charged."
- Joel Shoemaker of School Library Journal described the main characters of The Patron Saint of Butterflies by writing that both girls "occasionally seem wise beyond their years;" however, he noted, "readers will nevertheless cheer them on as they ponder the limits of faith and duty."
- Regarding the audio recording of the book, Heather Booth of Booklist reported that "This compelling story is well handled by a full cast of actors" and that "echoed voices are used to good effect for internal thoughts, and a church choir adds an extra boost in an especially powerful scene in this story of faith, doubt, and friendship."
- Also regarding the audio recording of the book, Amanda Raklovits writing in the School Library Journal said that "Despite some contrivances, listeners will be propelled along by the inherent tension in the narrative and the strength of the friendship between the protagonists."
