= Honesdale, Pennsylvania =

Borough in Pennsylvania, US

- Borough
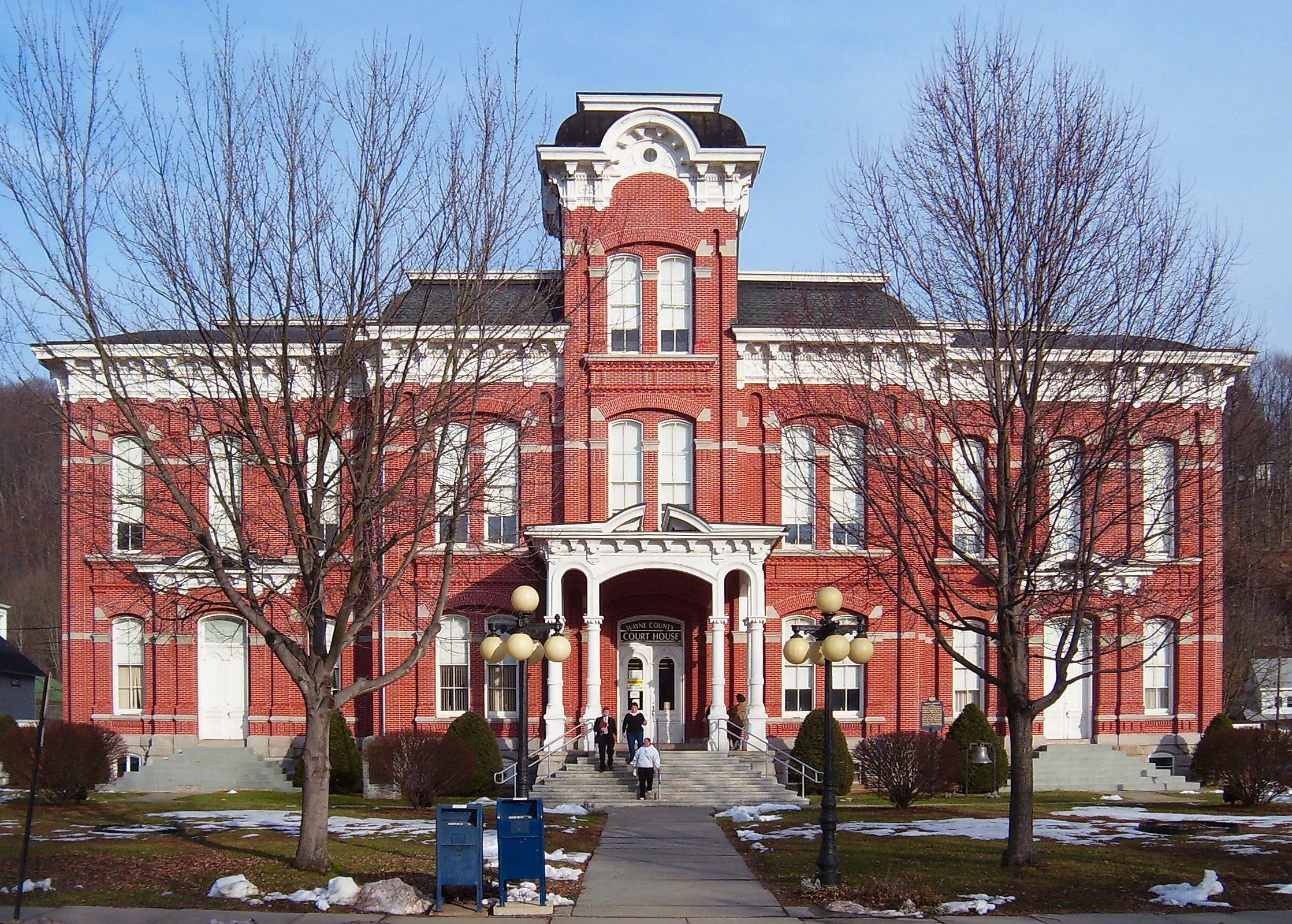
- The Wayne County Courthouse in Honesdale

- Flag Seal
- Nickname: Dyberry Forks
- Location in Wayne County and the U.S. state of Pennsylvania.

- Location of Honesdale in Pennsylvania Honesdale (the United States)
- Coordinates: 41°34′27″N 75°15′21″W
- Country: United States
- State: Pennsylvania
- US Congressional District: PA-8
- State Senatorial District: 20
- State House of Representatives District: 111
- County: Wayne
- School District: Wayne Highlands; Region II
- Settled: 1826
- Incorporated: January 28, 1831
- Named for: Philip Hone

Government
  - Type: Mayor-council
  - Mayor: Derek Williams
  - Borough Council: Council Members: James Hamill (President); Jason Newbon (Vice-President); James Jennings; Michael Augello; William McAllister; Jared Newbon; David Nilsen
  - US Representative: Matt Cartwright (D)
  - State Senator: Lisa Baker (R)
  - State Representative: Jonathan Fritz (R)

Area
  - Total: 4.02 sq mi (10.42 km^{2})
  - Land: 3.88 sq mi (10.05 km^{2})
  - Water: 0.14 sq mi (0.36 km^{2})
- Elevation: 981 ft (299 m)

Population (2020)
  - Total: 4,458
  - Density: 1,148.4/sq mi (443.41/km^{2})
- Time zone: UTC-5 (Eastern (EST))
  - Summer (DST): UTC-4 (Eastern Daylight (EDT))
- ZIP code: 18431
- Area codes: 570 and 272
- GNIS feature IDs: 1192628 (Place); 1192628 (Borough)
- FIPS code: 42-35520
- Waterways: Bunnells Pond, Carley Brook, Dyberry Creek, Lackawaxen River
- Website: Honesdale Borough

Honesdale is a borough and the county seat of, Wayne County, Pennsylvania, United States. Located along the Lackawaxen River in northeastern Pennsylvania, it lies within the northern Pocono region and serves as a commercial and cultural hub for the surrounding rural area. The population was 4,458 at the time of the 2020 census. Honesdale is located 32 miles (51 km) northeast of Scranton.

Founded in the 19th century, Honesdale developed as the starting point of the Delaware and Hudson Canal Company, which transported coal from northeastern Pennsylvania to New York City. The borough later became a center for rail transportation with the operation of the Stourbridge Lion, the first commercial steam locomotive in the United States. The surrounding area provides recreational opportunities such as hiking, fishing, and boating, reflecting Honesdale’s location in a rural and scenic region.

== History ==
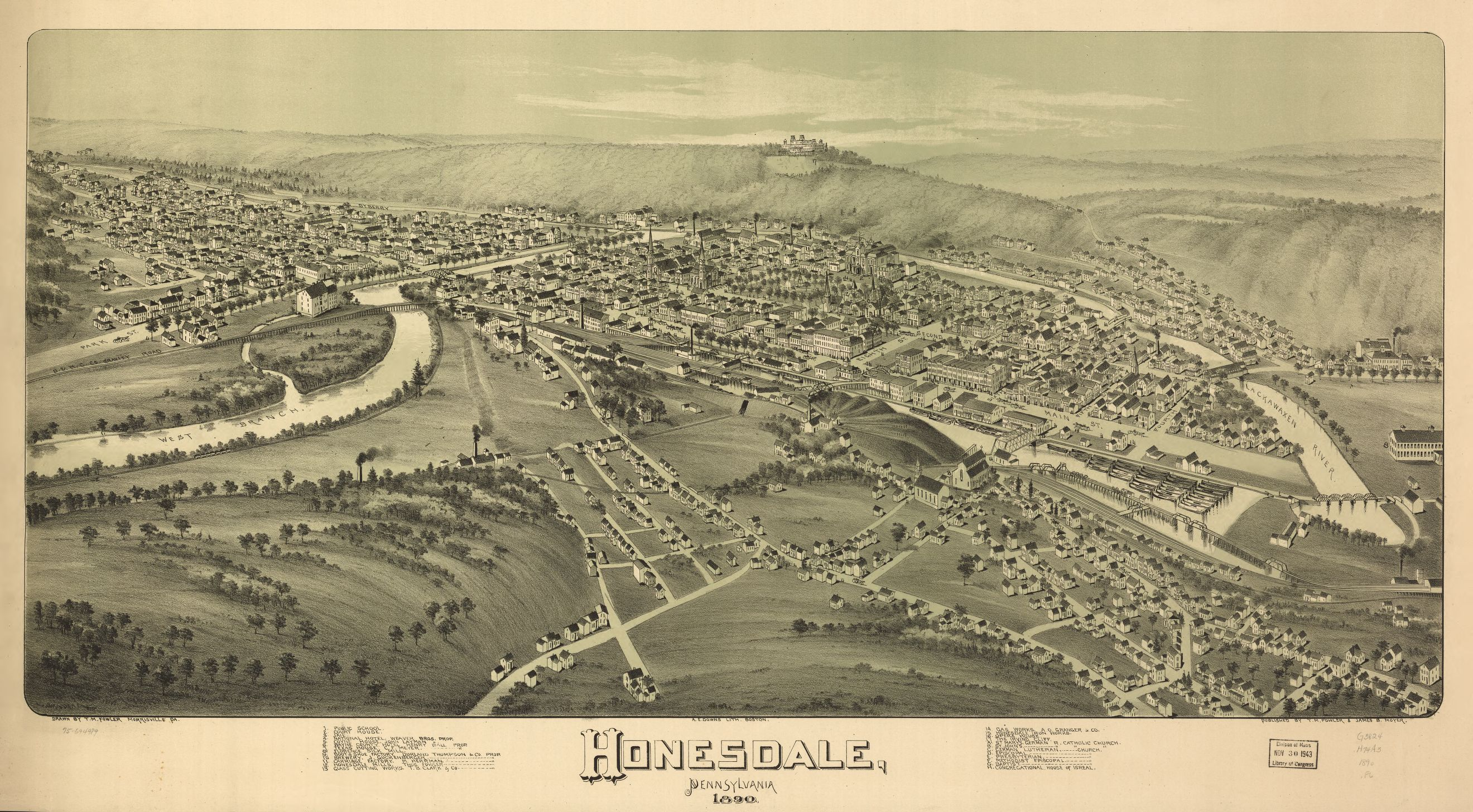
1890 panoramic map of Honesdale

=== Early settlement and name ===
The discovery of anthracite coal in northeastern Pennsylvania in the early 1800s and the need to transport this fuel to New York City led to the creation of the Delaware and Hudson Canal and the development of the Borough of Honesdale. The area, originally called Dyberry Forks for the confluence of the East and West branches of the Dyberry Creek, was laid out as a village in 1826 when the Delaware and Hudson (D&H) Canal was created. The borough was named for Philip Hone, former mayor of New York City and president of Honesdale's D&H Canal Company. Honesdale was incorporated as a borough on January 28, 1831.

The Honesdale Residential Historic District and the D&H Canal are listed on the National Register of Historic Places.

=== Birthplace of American railroading ===
Honesdale is recognized as the birthplace of the American Railroad. On August 8, 1829, the Stourbridge Lion, the first commercial steam locomotive run on rails in the United States, operated on a short stretch from Honesdale to Seelyville and back. The locomotive, owned by the D&H Canal Company, was considered too heavy for regular service, but the experiment marked a milestone in American transportation history.

The D&H Canal Company transported anthracite coal from mines near Carbondale to New York City via Honesdale and Kingston, New York. Coal was moved from the mines to Honesdale by a gravity-powered railroad, then transferred to barges along a 108-mile canal to Kingston, and finally shipped down the Hudson River to New York City.

The main boiler of the original Stourbridge Lion was eventually acquired by the Smithsonian Institution in 1890 and is currently on loan at the National Museum of Railroad History & Innovation in Baltimore, Maryland. Honesdale’s Wayne County Historical Society Museum contains a full-scale replica of the Stourbridge Lion, built by the D&H Railroad Company using the original blueprints for the 1933 Century of Progress Exposition in Chicago. The replica was relocated to Honesdale in 1941 and remains a central historical attraction.

Passenger excursions run seasonally along the historic Stourbridge Line from Honesdale to Hawley, covering twenty-five miles along the Lackawaxen River. Excursions depart from the platform at the Wayne County Visitors Center, offering visitors a chance to experience Honesdale’s railroading heritage.

== Geography ==
Honesdale is located at 41°34′27″N 75°15′21″W (41.574214, -75.255966).

According to the United States Census Bureau, the borough has a total area of 4.0 square miles (10 km^{2}), of which 3.9 square miles (10 km^{2}) is land and 0.1 square miles (0.26 km^{2}) (2.5%) is water of the Lackawaxen River, which flows through the heart of the town, and its confluence with Dyberry Creek. The waters contain fish and other aquatic life and attract hundreds of ducks, as well as eagles and other raptors.

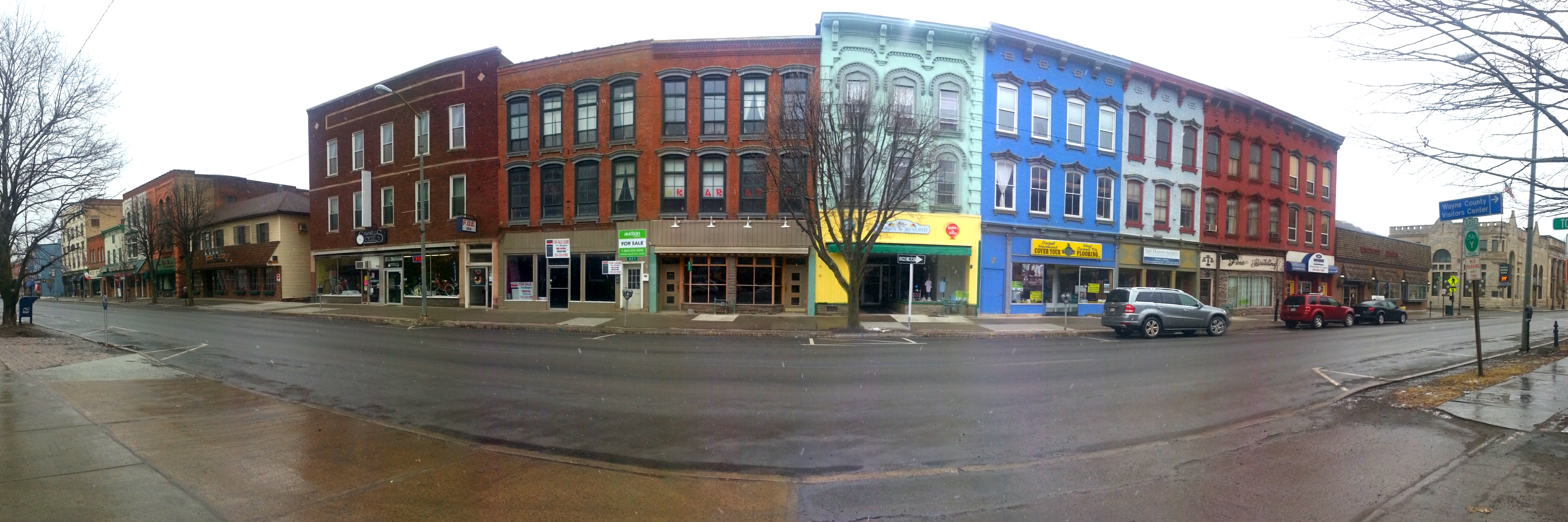
800 Block of Main Street, Honesdale

== Demographics ==
Historical population
Census	Pop.	Note	%±
1830	433		—
1840	1,086		150.8%
1850	2,263		108.4%
1860	2,544		12.4%
1870	2,654		4.3%
1880	2,620		−1.3%
1890	2,816		7.5%
1900	2,864		1.7%
1910	2,945		2.8%
1920	2,756		−6.4%
1930	5,490		99.2%
1940	5,687		3.6%
1950	5,662		−0.4%
1960	5,569		−1.6%
1970	5,224		−6.2%
1980	5,128		−1.8%
1990	4,972		−3.0%
2000	4,874		−2.0%
2010	4,480		−8.1%
2020	4,458		−0.5%

=== 2020 census ===
As of the 2020 census, Honesdale had a population of 4,458. The median age was 44.5 years. 20.0% of residents were under the age of 18 and 23.4% of residents were 65 years of age or older. For every 100 females there were 88.1 males, and for every 100 females age 18 and over there were 82.5 males age 18 and over.

94.3% of residents lived in urban areas, while 5.7% lived in rural areas.

There were 2,116 households in Honesdale, of which 24.2% had children under the age of 18 living in them. Of all households, 32.0% were married-couple households, 21.8% were households with a male householder and no spouse or partner present, and 38.7% were households with a female householder and no spouse or partner present. About 41.4% of all households were made up of individuals and 19.7% had someone living alone who was 65 years of age or older.

There were 2,420 housing units, of which 12.6% were vacant. The homeowner vacancy rate was 3.8% and the rental vacancy rate was 7.5%.

Racial composition as of the 2020 census
Race	Number	Percent
White	4,007	89.9%
Black or African American	50	1.1%
American Indian and Alaska Native	9	0.2%
Asian	43	1.0%
Native Hawaiian and Other Pacific Islander	0	0.0%
Some other race	41	0.9%
Two or more races	308	6.9%
Hispanic or Latino (of any race)	216	4.8%

=== 2010 census ===
As of the census of 2010, there were 4,480 people, 2,086 households, and 1,147 families residing in the borough. The population density was 1,148.7 inhabitants per square mile (443.5/km^{2}). There were 2,357 housing units at an average density of 604.4 per square mile (233.4/km^{2}). The racial makeup of the borough was 96.8% White, 0.9% African American, 0.1% Native American, 0.4% Asian, 0.6% from other races, and 1.2% from two or more races. Hispanic or Latino of any race were 2.8% of the population.

There were 2,086 households, out of which 26.2% had children under the age of 18 living with them, 35.8% were married couples living together, 14.2% had a female householder with no husband present, and 45% were non-families. 39.2% of all households were made up of individuals, and 18.4% had someone living alone who was 65 years of age or older. The average household size was 2.15 and the average family size was 2.88.

In the borough the population was spread out, with 22.4% under the age of 18, 58.8% from 18 to 64, and 18.8% who were 65 years of age or older. The median age was 42 years.

The median income for a household in the borough was $32,644, and the median income for a family was $42,088. Males had a median income of $33,553 versus $30,179 for females. The per capita income for the borough was $20,122. About 19.1% of families and 19.6% of the population were below the poverty line, including 33.4% of those under age 18 and 10.7% of those age 65 or over.

== Media and publications ==
The daily newspaper, The Wayne Independent, was established at Honesdale in 1878, and emphasizes local stories. As of October 2019, The Wayne Independent is now The Tri-County Independent, its publisher having forced its merger with four former newspapers it owned.

The local radio stations are WDNH 95.3 FM and WPSN 104.3FM, 101.9FM, and 1590am. In addition to local news, events, and weather, WPSN broadcasts the Honesdale Hornets High School football games every Friday night during football season.

The children's magazine Highlights for Children, a monthly magazine for children ages 6 to 12, was founded in Honesdale in 1946. The magazine features fiction stories, nonfiction articles, brainteasers, and puzzles, including Hidden Pictures puzzles. The publisher maintains its editorial headquarters on Church St. in Honesdale, while their business offices are in Columbus, Ohio. Highlights International's products are available in 40 countries and in 16 languages, serving a global audience with educational and entertaining content.

Yoga International, based in Honesdale, publishes online content on yoga, meditation, and mindful living. In 2018 Yoga International was recognized as the 122nd fastest growing private company in the United States on Inc.’s 500|5000 list.

== Education ==
The school district is the Wayne Highlands School District.

Honesdale High School is a public, four-year, regional high school serving grades 9–12 in Honesdale, as a part of the Wayne Highlands School District. The district includes four elementary schools, one middle school, and one high school. Stourbridge Primary Center and Lakeside Elementary School serves children from Honesdale, and Wayne Highlands Middle School serve grades 6–8 in Honesdale. In 2006, the district was recognized for excellence in teaching, and has a long tradition of requiring standards of its graduates well beyond state regulations.

== Healthcare ==
The hospital serving Honesdale and the surrounding communities is Wayne Memorial Hospital. Wayne Memorial Hospital is a non-profit, community-controlled hospital based in Honesdale with inpatient and outpatient care in more than 30 medical specialties. Wayne Memorial Hospital is the heart of Wayne Memorial Health System, which serves 100,000 people across Wayne and Pike Counties. The clinical affiliate, Wayne Memorial Community Health Centers, operates primary care services around the county, dental services, women's health and behavioral health centers. A $40 million expansion of the hospital was completed in 2019. The 85,000 square foot tower houses 50 private patient rooms and technology designed to reduce the risk for infection, enhance communication and decrease noise levels.

== Places ==
- Honesdale has hundreds of Victorian age structures, and features several tall church steeples, historically significant buildings of many kinds, and a memorial Central Park beside the Wayne County Courthouse. While current zoning laws do not require building remodelling to remain historically accurate, the vast majority of houses and structures remain architecturally as they were constructed, often more than a century past.
- Honesdale was home to the Roman Catholic St. Vincent's Elementary School, located on Cliff Street. The school closed at the end of the 2008–2009 school year after declining enrollment. Nonetheless, two Catholic churches continue with vigorous participation, as do churches of other denominations and a synagogue.
- Irving Cliff, 300 feet high, named for Washington Irving who loved its prominence, overlooks the town and offers a compelling view of the confluence of the Lackawaxen River and Dyberry Creek and virtually everything else in the valley. The cliff is surmounted by Gibbons Memorial Park with a 50-foot electric framework for a Christmas Star and Easter Cross that are visible for miles during holiday nights. Fireworks are fired from the cliff for Independence Day festivities.
- Many summer camps are located in and around Honesdale, including Bryn Mawr Camp, Camp Cayuga, Camp IHC, formerly known as Indian Head Camp, Camp Lavi, Camp Morasha, Camp Moshava, formerly Camp Navajo, Camp Nesher, Camp Ramah in the Poconos, Camp Raninu, Camp Seneca Lake, Summit Camp, Camp Towanda, Trail's End Camp, Tyler Hill Camp, Camp Watonka, Camp Wayne and Camp Weequahic. Many campers travel from the New York Metropolitan Area, New England, Philadelphia and further afield to attend camps in the area, as they have for many decades. The camps are the county's largest industry.
- Cranker's Collection of Mechanical Marvels includes a private collection of classic cars mostly from the 1920s and 1930s. There are also several dance hall organs, Edison phonographs, and other music boxes from the 1800s.

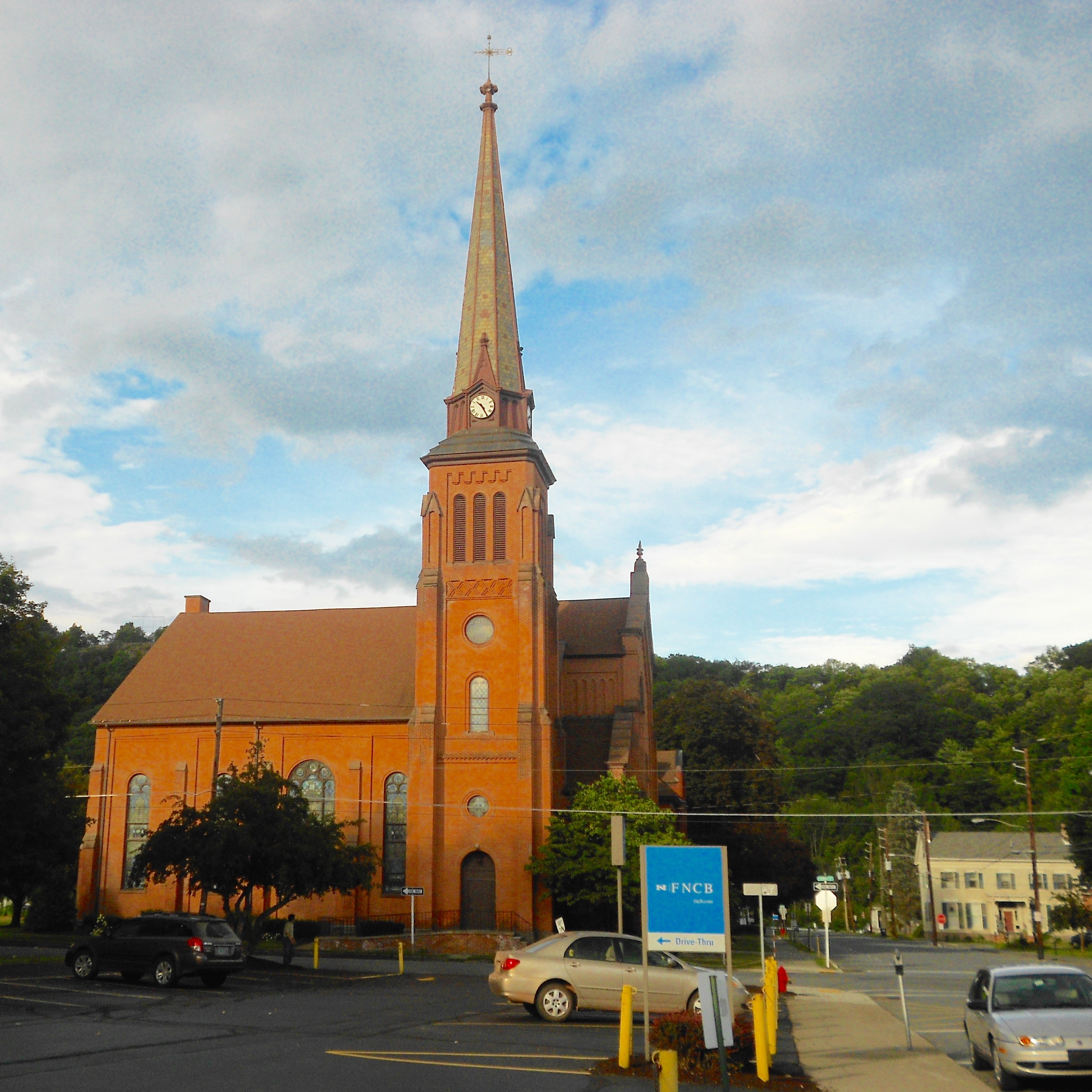
First Presbyterian Church

== Arts and culture ==
The Wayne County Arts Alliance is a non-profit organization of volunteers interested in the benefits of arts in the county. One of its initiatives is The Great Wall of Honesdale, a large public art display at the intersection of 4th Street and Main Street. In addition, there are several murals along Honesdale's Main Street and in its vicinity.

Honesdale hosts the annual Wayne County Fair, starting on the first Friday in August and spans nine days. It features typical county-fair events, such as concession stands, harness racing, livestock contests, amusement rides, and concerts. Nearly 100,000 visitors attend the fair each year.

The Honesdale Roots and Rhythm Music and Arts Festival is held throughout Honesdale on the third Saturday in June. The main stage is set up along Court Street playing to festival goers in Central Park. Artists and food vendors are lined along the park. Several other stages are set up throughout the town offering music all day.

The Cooperage Project is housed in a restored barrel making factory. In 2019 the Cooperage Project held 350 events, including 65 musical and theater performances. Educational programs are also provided for all ages. The Main Street Farmers' Market, run from the facility, allows farmers to sell directly to the community.

The Himalayan Institute of Yoga Science and Philosophy is a non-profit organization providing yoga, meditation, and spiritual programs. The organization was founded in 1971 by Swami Rama, and its world headquarters are located in Honesdale. The Himalayan Institute has a number of humanitarian projects underway in Cameroon, India, and Mexico. In additional, the Himalayan Institute also operates Yoga International magazine.

== Notable people ==
- Brian Balthazar, (born Brian Balthaser) television personality (born in Honesdale).
- Q. David Bowers, born 1938, author and numismatist
- John J. Boyle (1919–2003), 19th Public Printer of the United States (born in Honesdale)
- Emma May Buckingham (1836–1919), writer, educator, and published author who lived and taught in Honesdale.
- Florence Goodenough, born 1886, psychology pioneer in area of intelligence (born in Honesdale).
- Mary Dimmick Harrison (1858–1948), second wife of President Benjamin Harrison
- Edgar Jadwin (1865–1931), former Chief of Engineers, United States Army Corps of Engineers
- Tom Jones (1874-1923), Major League Baseball first basemen for the Baltimore Orioles, the St. Louis Browns, and the Detroit Tigers
- Frederick W. Keator (1855–1924), Episcopal bishop
- Lyman Lemnitzer (1899–1988), general, U.S. Army and former chairman of the Joint Chiefs of Staff
- Ruth McGinnis, World Women's Billiard Champion in the 1930s
- John Olver, former member of U.S. House of Representatives representing Massachusetts's 1st congressional district
- Daniel J. O'Neill, (1937–2015), US Army major general
- David M. Peterson (1894–1919), flying ace of World War I
- Richard B. Smith (1901–1935), co-wrote the song "Winter Wonderland" in 1934; his house still stands on Church St., Honesdale
- Lauren Spierer, who mysteriously disappeared in 2011, spent a summer at Camp Towanda and met friends who became part of her social circle at Indiana University
- Richard J. Tallman (1925–1972), U.S. Army Brigadier-General, killed in action in Vietnam in 1972
- Clarissa Tracy (1818–1905), botanist, taught here
- Art Wall Jr. (1923–2001), professional golfer, 1959 Masters champion
- Morris Wilkins, inventor of heart-shaped bathtub and champagne glass bathtub
- Sarah Jane Scott, born 1988, German pop star, hit song Halo Halo.

== In popular culture ==
=== Music ===
- Winter Wonderland (1934), the classic holiday song, was inspired by the snowy landscape of Honesdale’s Central Park and was co-written by native Richard B. Smith.

=== Film ===
- Wet Hot American Summer (2001) was shot at Camp Towanda in Honesdale in spring 2000.
- Blue Valentine (2010), starring Ryan Gosling and Michelle Williams, started filming in Honesdale and the surrounding areas in spring 2009.
- 44 Pages (2017) is a documentary film about the Highlights for Children editorial offices was filmed in Honesdale. The documentary focuses on the efforts of publishing a magazines each month, as well as the letters received and answered from children around the world.

=== Television ===
- The fifth episode of the Netflix documentary series Rotten features a Honesdale dairy farmer.

== See also ==
- Glen Dyberry Cemetery, Honesdale
