= Dyberry Creek =

River in Pennsylvania, United States

Coordinates: 41.64539°N 75.27567°W

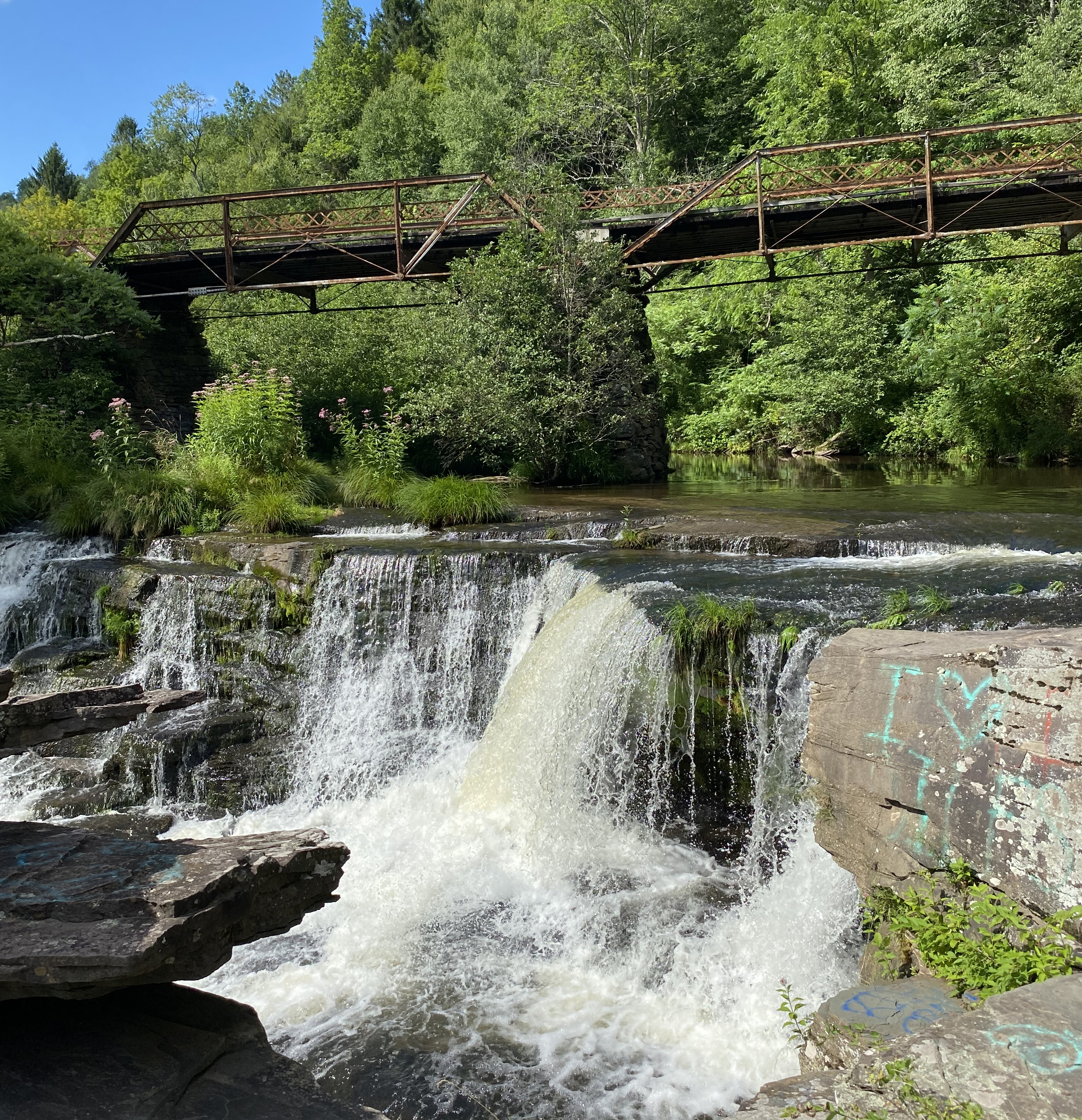
Tanners Falls bridge over west branch Dyberry Creek

Dyberry Creek is a 7.3-mile-long (11.7 km) tributary of the Lackawaxen River in Wayne County, Pennsylvania, in the United States.

Dyberry Creek joins the Lackawaxen River at Honesdale. The creek is formed by the confluence of two branches: the east and west.

The creek and its branches are often stocked with trout.

== See also ==
- List of rivers of Pennsylvania
