= The Open Boat =

1897 short story by Stephen Crane

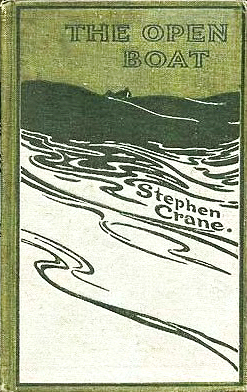
First American edition of The Open Boat, illustrated by Will H. Bradley, Doubleday, New York, 1898.

"The Open Boat" is a short story by American author Stephen Crane (1871–1900). First published in 1897, it was based on Crane's experience of surviving a shipwreck off the coast of Florida earlier that year while traveling to Cuba to work as a newspaper correspondent. Crane was stranded at sea for thirty hours when his ship, the SS Commodore, sank after hitting a sandbar. He and three other men were forced to navigate their way to shore in a small boat; one of the men, an oiler named Billie Higgins, drowned after the boat overturned. Crane's personal account of the shipwreck and the men's survival, titled "Stephen Crane's Own Story", was first published a few days after his rescue.

Crane subsequently adapted his report into narrative form, and the resulting short story "The Open Boat" was published in Scribner's Magazine. The story is told from the point of view of an anonymous correspondent, with Crane as the implied author; the action closely resembles the author's experiences after the shipwreck. A volume titled The Open Boat and Other Tales of Adventure was published in the United States in 1898; an edition entitled The Open Boat and Other Stories was published simultaneously in England. Praised for its innovation by contemporary critics, the story is considered an exemplary work of literary Naturalism, and is one of the most frequently discussed works in Crane's canon. It is notable for its use of imagery, irony, symbolism, and the exploration of such themes as survival, solidarity, and the conflict between man and nature. H. G. Wells considered "The Open Boat" to be "beyond all question, the crown of all [Crane's] work".

== Plot summary ==
None of them knew the color of the sky. Their eyes glanced level, and were fastened upon the waves that swept toward them. These waves were of the hue of slate, save for the tops, which were of foaming white, and all of the men knew the colors of the sea. The horizon narrowed and widened, and dipped and rose, and at all times its edge was jagged with waves that seemed thrust up in points like rocks.

"The Open Boat" focuses on four characters: the correspondent (based upon Crane himself), a condescending observer detached from the rest of the group; the captain, who is injured and morose at having lost his ship, yet capable of leadership; the cook, fat and comical, but optimistic that they will be rescued; and the oiler, Billie, who is physically the strongest, and the only one in the story referred to by name. The four are survivors of a shipwreck, which occurred before the beginning of the story, and are drifting at sea in a small dinghy.

The story is divided into seven sections and is told mainly from the correspondent's point of view. The first section introduces the four men, whose moods fluctuate over the next four sections from anger at their desperate situation, to a growing empathy for one another and the sudden realization that nature is indifferent to their fates. The men become fatigued and bicker with one another; nevertheless, the oiler and the correspondent take turns rowing toward shore, while the cook bails water to keep the boat afloat. When they see a lighthouse on the horizon, their hope is tempered with the realization of the danger of trying to reach it. Their hopes dwindle further when, after seeing a man waving from shore, and what may or may not be another boat, they fail to make contact. The correspondent and the oiler continue to take turns rowing, while the others sleep fitfully during the night. The correspondent then notices a shark swimming near the boat, but he does not seem to be bothered by it as one would expect. In the sixth section, the correspondent wearily recalls a verse from the poem "Bingen on the Rhine" by Caroline Norton, in which a "soldier of the Legion" dies far from home.

The final section begins with the men's resolution to abandon the slowly sinking boat they have occupied for thirty hours and to swim ashore. As they begin the long swim to the beach, Billie the oiler, the strongest of the four, swims ahead of the others; the captain advances towards the shore while still holding onto the boat, and the cook uses a surviving oar. The correspondent is trapped by a local current, but is eventually able to swim on. After three of the men safely reach the shore and are met by a group of rescuers, they find Billie dead, his body washed up on the beach.

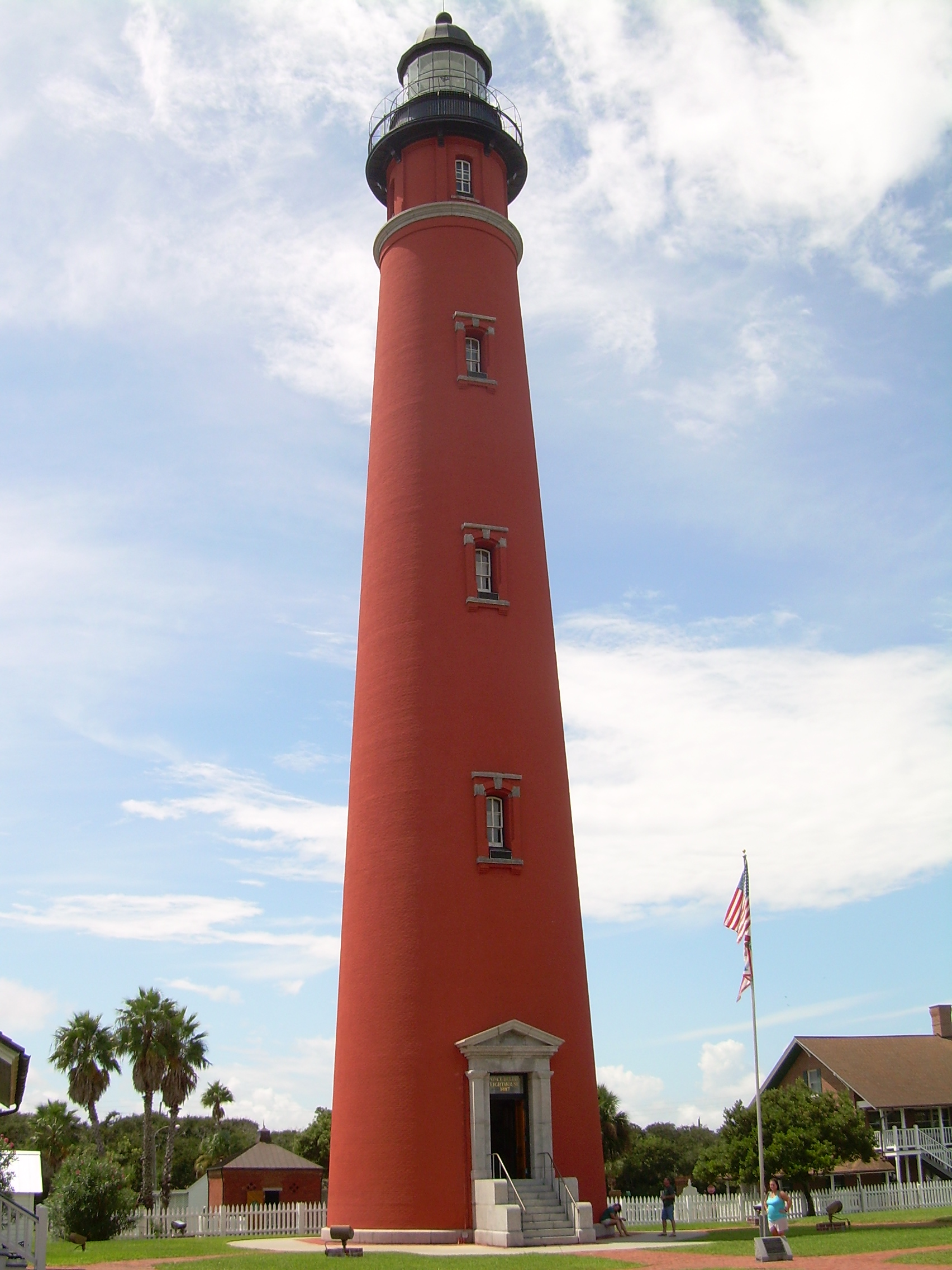
The Mosquito Inlet Light, now known as the Ponce de Leon Inlet Light, is viewed by the men from their open boat.

== Background ==
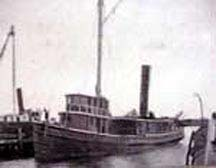
The SS Commodore at dock

Hired by the Bacheller newspaper syndicate to serve as a war correspondent during the Cuban insurrection against Spain, the 25-year-old Stephen Crane boarded the filibustering steamship SS Commodore on New Year's Eve, 1896. The ship sailed from Jacksonville, Florida, with 27 or 28 men and a cargo of supplies and ammunition for the Cuban rebels. On the St. Johns River, less than 2 miles (3 km) from Jacksonville, Commodore struck a sandbar in a dense fog and damaged its hull. Although towed off the sandbar the following day, it was again beached in Mayport, Florida, and further damaged. A leak began in the boiler room that evening, and as a result of malfunctioning water pumps, the ship came to a standstill about 16 miles (26 km) from Mosquito Inlet (now called Ponce de León Inlet). As the ship took on more water, Crane described the engine room as resembling "a scene at this time taken from the middle kitchen of Hades."

Commodore's lifeboats were lowered in the early hours of the morning on January 2, 1897, and the ship sank at 7 a.m. Crane was one of the last to leave the ship in a 10-foot (3.0 m) dinghy. He and three other men (including the captain, Edward Murphy) floundered off the coast of Florida for a day and a half before attempting to land their craft at Daytona Beach. The small boat, however, overturned in the surf, forcing the exhausted men to swim to shore; one of them, an oiler named Billie Higgins, died. The disaster was front-page news in newspapers across the country; rumors that the ship had been sabotaged were widely circulated but never substantiated.

Crane was reunited with his girlfriend, Cora, several days after the ordeal, and quickly wrote his initial report of the sinking while waiting in Jacksonville for another ship. Desperate for work, he soon left for New York to secure a job covering the impending Greco-Turkish War. Crane completed the story that would become "The Open Boat" a few weeks later, in mid-February. According to fellow correspondent Ralph D. Paine, Crane had the opportunity to show the first draft of the short story to Murphy when Crane again passed through Jacksonville. When Crane asked his opinion, Murphy allegedly replied, "You've got it, Steve ... That is just how it happened, and how we felt. Read me some more of it".

== Publication history ==
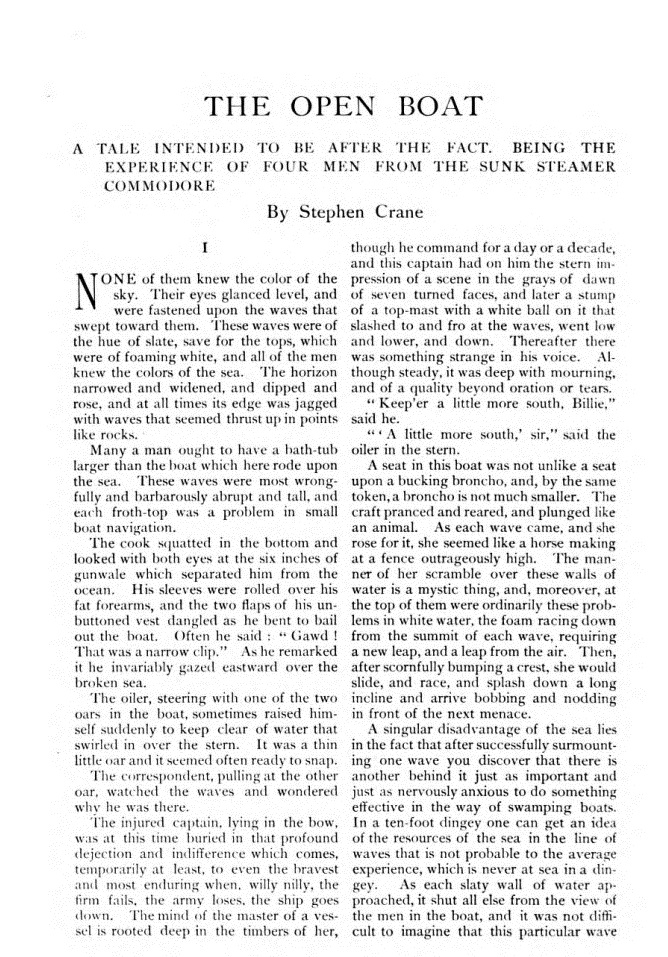
Appearance in Scribner's Magazine, June 1897, Vol. XXI, No. 6.

Crane's report of the shipwreck appeared on the front page of the New York Press on January 7, 1897, only three days after his rescue, and was quickly reprinted in various other papers. The account, titled "Stephen Crane's Own Story", concentrates mainly on the sinking of the Commodore, and the ensuing chaos. Crane dedicates just two paragraphs to the fate of his compatriots and himself on the dinghy, while detailing their inability to save those stranded on the sinking ship:

The cook let go of the line. We rowed around to see if we could not get a line from the chief engineer, and all this time, mind you, there were no shrieks, no groans, but silence, silence and silence, and then the Commodore sank. She lurched to windward, then swung afar back, righted and dove into the sea, and the rafts were suddenly swallowed by this frightful maw of the ocean. And then by the men on the ten-foot dingy were words said that were still not words—something far beyond words.

The report caused a sensation and spurred the author to write a narrative version of the events. The short story first appeared in the June 1897 issue of Scribner's Magazine. A second and lesser story, "Flanagan and His Short Filibustering Adventure", based upon the same shipwreck but told from the point of view of the captain, was published in McClure's Magazine in October 1897. "The Open Boat" was published in the United States by Doubleday & McClure in April 1898 as part of the book The Open Boat and Other Tales of Adventure, which included additional works by Crane such as "The Bride Comes to Yellow Sky", "Death and the Child", and "The Wise Men". The English volume, published simultaneously with the American one, was titled The Open Boat and Other Stories and published by William Heinemann. Both editions included the subtitle "A Tale Intended to Be after the Fact. Being the Experience of Four Men from the Sunk Steamer 'Commodore' ", and were dedicated "To the late William Higgins and to Captain Edward Murphy and Steward C. B. Montgomery of the Sunk Steamer Commodore".

== Style and genre ==
Although autobiographical in nature, "The Open Boat" is a work of fiction; it is often considered a principal example of Naturalism, an offshoot of the Realist literary movement, in which scientific principles of objectivity and detachment are applied to the study of human characteristics. While a majority of critics agree that the story acts as a paradigm of the human situation, they disagree as to its precise nature. Some believe the story affirms man's place in the world by concentrating on the characters' isolation, while others—including those who call "The Open Boat" ideologically Symbolist—insist that the story questions man's place in the universe through metaphorical or indirect means.

Like other major works by Stephen Crane, "The Open Boat" contains numerous examples of symbolism, imagery and metaphor. Vibrant descriptions of color, combined with simple, clear writing, are also apparent throughout, and humor in the form of irony serves in stark opposition to the dreary setting and desperate characters. Editor Vincent Starrett stated in his introduction to the 1921 collection of Crane's work entitled Men, Women and Boats that the author keeps "down the tone where another writer might have attempted 'fine writing' and have been lost." Other critics have noted similarities between the story and shipwreck-related articles Crane wrote while working as a reporter for the New York Tribune earlier in his career. Articles such as "The Wreck of the New Era", which describes a group of castaways drowning in sight of a helpless crowd, and "Ghosts on the Jersey Coast" contain stark imagery that strongly prefigures that of "The Open Boat".

== Major themes ==
=== Man vs. nature ===
Similar to other Naturalist works, "The Open Boat" scrutinizes the position of man, who has been alienated not only from society, but also from God and nature. The struggle between man and the natural world is the most apparent theme in the work, and while the characters at first believe the turbulent sea to be a hostile force set against them, they come to believe that nature is instead ambivalent. At the beginning of the last section, the correspondent rethinks his view of nature's hostility: "the serenity of nature amid the struggles of the individual—nature in the wind, and nature in the vision of men. She did not seem cruel to him, nor beneficent, nor treacherous, nor wise. But she was indifferent, flatly indifferent." The correspondent regularly refers to the sea with feminine pronouns, pitting the four men in the boat against an intangible, yet effeminate, threat; critic Leedice Kissane further pointed to the story's seeming denigration of women, noting the castaways' personification of Fate as "an old ninny-woman" and "an old hen". That nature is ultimately disinterested is an idea that appears in other works by Crane; a poem from Crane's 1899 collection War is Kind and Other Lines also echoes Crane's common theme of universal indifference:

A man said to the universe:
"Sir, I exist!"
"However," replied the universe,
"The fact has not created in me
A sense of obligation."

The metaphysical conflicts born from man's isolation are also important themes throughout the story, as the characters cannot rely on a higher cause or being for protection. The correspondent laments the lack of religious support, as well as his inability to blame God for his misfortunes, musing: "When it occurs to a man that nature does not regard him as important, and that she feels she would not maim the universe by disposing of him, he at first wishes to throw bricks at the temple, and he hates deeply that there are no bricks and no temples." Man's perception of himself and the world around him are also constantly questioned; the correspondent regularly refers to the way things "seemed" or "appeared", leaving how a thing actually "was" entirely ambiguous. Wolford similarly pointed to the importance of the story's strong yet problematic opening line—"None of them knew the color of the sky"—as one that sets the scene for the story's sense of unease and uncertainty.

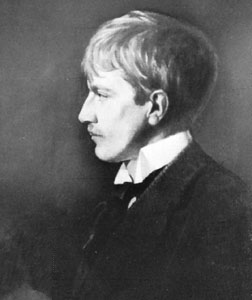
Stephen Crane as painted by Corwin K. Linson in 1894

=== Survival and solidarity ===
Chester Wolford noted in his critical analysis of Crane's short fiction that although one of the author's most familiar themes deals with a character's seeming insignificance in an indifferent universe, the correspondent's experience in "The Open Boat" is perhaps more personal than what was described in earlier stories because of Crane's obvious connection to the story. Sergio Perosa similarly described how Crane "transfigures an actual occurrence into existential drama, and confers universal meaning and poetic value on the simple retelling of man's struggle for survival".

Facing an ultimately detached nature, the characters find solace in human solidarity. They are often referred to collectively as "the men", rather than singularly by their professions, creating a silent understanding between them of their togetherness. The first few sentences of section three attest to this connection: "It would be difficult to describe the subtle brotherhood of men that was here established on the seas. No one said that it was so. No one mentioned it. But it dwelt in the boat, and each man felt it warm him. They were a captain, an oiler, a cook, and a correspondent, and they were friends, friends in a more curiously iron-bound degree than may be common." Survival is also an important thematic element in itself, as it is contingent upon the men to battle the elements in order to save themselves. The correspondent's desire to survive is evident in his refrain of the lyrical line: "If I am going to be drowned—if I am going to be drowned—if I am going to be drowned, why, in the name of the seven mad gods who rule the sea, was I allowed to come thus far and contemplate sand and trees?" By repeating himself, the correspondent expresses himself ritualistically, and yet he remains existentially adrift.

=== Sympathy ===
In his 1990 book Sea-Brothers: The Tradition of American Sea Fiction from Moby-Dick to the Present, author Bert Bender noted Crane's sympathetic portrayal of the oiler Billie, the most physically able of the four characters, and yet the only one to perish. The correspondent even notes with wonder Billie's exceptional ability to row despite having worked a double shift before the ship sank. Bender wrote that Crane "emphasizes that Billie's steady, simple labor is the tangible basis for his role here as a savior," and that the oiler's portrayal as a "simple, working seaman, clearly expresses his sympathy with the democratic ideal of the sailor before the mast that figures so crucially in the tradition of American sea fiction." That Billie does not survive the ordeal, however, can be seen as an antithesis to Darwinism in that the only person to not survive was in fact the strongest physically.

A Soldier of the Legion lay dying in Algiers,
There was lack of woman's nursing, there was dearth of woman's tears;
But a comrade stood beside him, and he took that comrade's hand,
And he said, "I shall never see my own, my native land".

— Caroline Norton, "Bingen on the Rhine", as quoted in "The Open Boat"

"The Open Boat" directly references Lady Caroline Norton's 1883 poem "Bingen on the Rhine", which focuses on the death of a French Foreign Legionnaire, far from home, while grasping the hand of a comrade. Recalling the poem, the correspondent sees how the soldier's dire circumstances mirror his own, leading him to feel sorry for the anonymous poetic figure; noting the similarities between the dying soldier and the shipwrecked correspondent, critics such as Edward Stone and Max Westbrook believe this realization causes the correspondent to discover the necessity for human sympathy in an uncaring world. While the literary reference may be considered ironic, unsympathetic, and only of minor interest, Stone for one argued that this poem may also have served as a source for The Red Badge of Courage, which also explores man's relationship with the metaphysical.

== Reception and legacy ==
"The Open Boat" is one of the most frequently discussed works in Crane's canon, and is regularly anthologized. Wilson Follett included the story in the twelfth volume of his 1927 collection of Crane's work, and it also appeared in Robert Stallman's 1952 volume Stephen Crane: An Omnibus. The story and its subsequent eponymous collections received high acclaim from contemporary critics and authors. Praising the merit of the story and his friend's literary importance, journalist Harold Frederic wrote in his review for The New York Times that "even if he had written nothing else, ["The Open Boat" would] have placed [Crane] where he now undoubtedly stands." English poet Robert Bridges likewise praised the story in his review for Life, stating that Crane "has indelibly fixed the experience on your mind, and that is the test of a literary artisan". American Newspaperman and author Harry Esty Dounce praised the story as chief among Crane's work, despite its seemingly simple plot, writing for the New York Evening Sun that "those who have read 'The Open Boat' will forget every technical feat of construction before they forget the long, heartbreaking mockery of the day, with land so near, the bailing, the egg-shell changes of seats, the terrible, steady cheerfulness and brotherhood of the queer little human group".

After Crane's premature death from tuberculosis at the age of 28, his work enjoyed a resurgence of popularity. Author and critic Elbert Hubbard wrote in Crane's obituary in the Philistine that "The Open Boat" was "the sternest, creepiest bit of realism ever penned". Also noting the depressing Realism utilized in the story, editor Vincent Starrett stated: "It is a desolate picture, and the tale is one of our greatest short stories." Another of the author's friends, H. G. Wells, wrote that "The Open Boat" was "beyond all question, the crown of all [Crane's] work." Singling out Crane's usage of color and chiaroscuro in his writing, Wells continued: "It has all the stark power of the earlier stories, with a new element of restraint; the color is as full and strong as ever, fuller and stronger, indeed; but those chromatic splashes that at times deafen and confuse in The Red Badge, those images that astonish rather than enlighten, are disciplined and controlled." The story remains popular with critics; Thomas Kent referred to "The Open Boat" as Crane's "magnum opus", while Crane biographer Stanley Wertheim called it "Crane's finest short story and one of the masterworks of late nineteenth-century American literature". Writer Ernest Hemingway references the story in his 1935 book Green Hills of Africa and calls it, along with "The Blue Hotel", one of Crane's two greatest stories. Author Ralph Ellison particularly praised the perspective a reader of "The Open Boat" experiences: "We become one with the men in the boat, who pit their skill and courage against the raging sea, living in their hope and despair and sharing the companionship won within the capricious hand of fate".

== General references ==
- Bassan, Maurice. 1967. Stephen Crane: A Collection of Critical Essays. Englewood Cliffs, N.J.: Prentice-Hall, Inc.
- Bender M, Bert. 1990. Sea-Brothers: The Tradition of American Sea Fiction from Moby-Dick to the Present. Philadelphia: University of Pennsylvania Press.
- Crane, Stephen. 1898. The Open Boat and Other Tales of Adventure. New York: Doubleday & McClure Co.
- Davis, Linda H. 1998. Badge of Courage: The Life of Stephen Crane. New York: Mifflin. ISBN 0-89919-934-8.
- Dooley, Patrick K. 1994. The Pluralistic Philosophy of Stephen Crane. Urbana: University of Illinois Press. ISBN 0-252-01950-4.
- Halliburton, David. 1989. The Color of the Sky: A Study of Stephen Crane. New York: Cambridge University Press. ISBN 0-521-36274-1.
- Hayes, Kevin J. 2012. A Journey Through American Literature. New York: Oxford University Press. ISBN 978-0-19-986206-1.
- Hoffman, Daniel. 1971. The Poetry of Stephen Crane. Columbia University Press. ISBN 0-231-08662-8.
- Kent, Thomas. 1986. Interpretation and Genre: The Role of Generic Perception in the Study of Narrative Texts. Lewisburg: Bucknell University Press.
- Schaefer, Michael W. 1996. A Reader's Guide to the Short Stories of Stephen Crane. New York: G.K. Hall & Co. ISBN 0-8161-7285-4.
- Sorrentino, Paul. 2006. Stephen Crane Remembered. Tuscaloosa: University of Alabama Press. ISBN 0-8173-1503-9.
- Starrett, Vincent. 1921. "Stephen Crane: An Estimate". Men, Women and Boats. New York: Boni and Liveright.
- Weatherford, Richard M. 1997. Stephen Crane: The Critical Heritage. New York: Routledge. ISBN 0-415-15936-9.
- Wertheim, Stanley. 1997. A Stephen Crane Encyclopedia. Westport, CT: Greenwood Press. ISBN 0-313-29692-8.
- Wertheim, Stanley and Paul Sorrentino. 1994. The Crane Log: A Documentary Life of Stephen Crane, 1871–1900. New York: G. K. Hall & Co. ISBN 0-8161-7292-7.
- Wolford, Chester L. 1989. Stephen Crane: A Study of the Short Fiction. Boston: Twayne Publishers. ISBN 0-8057-8315-6.
