= Cape Canaveral, Florida =

Small city in Florida, US

- City
- City of Cape Canaveral
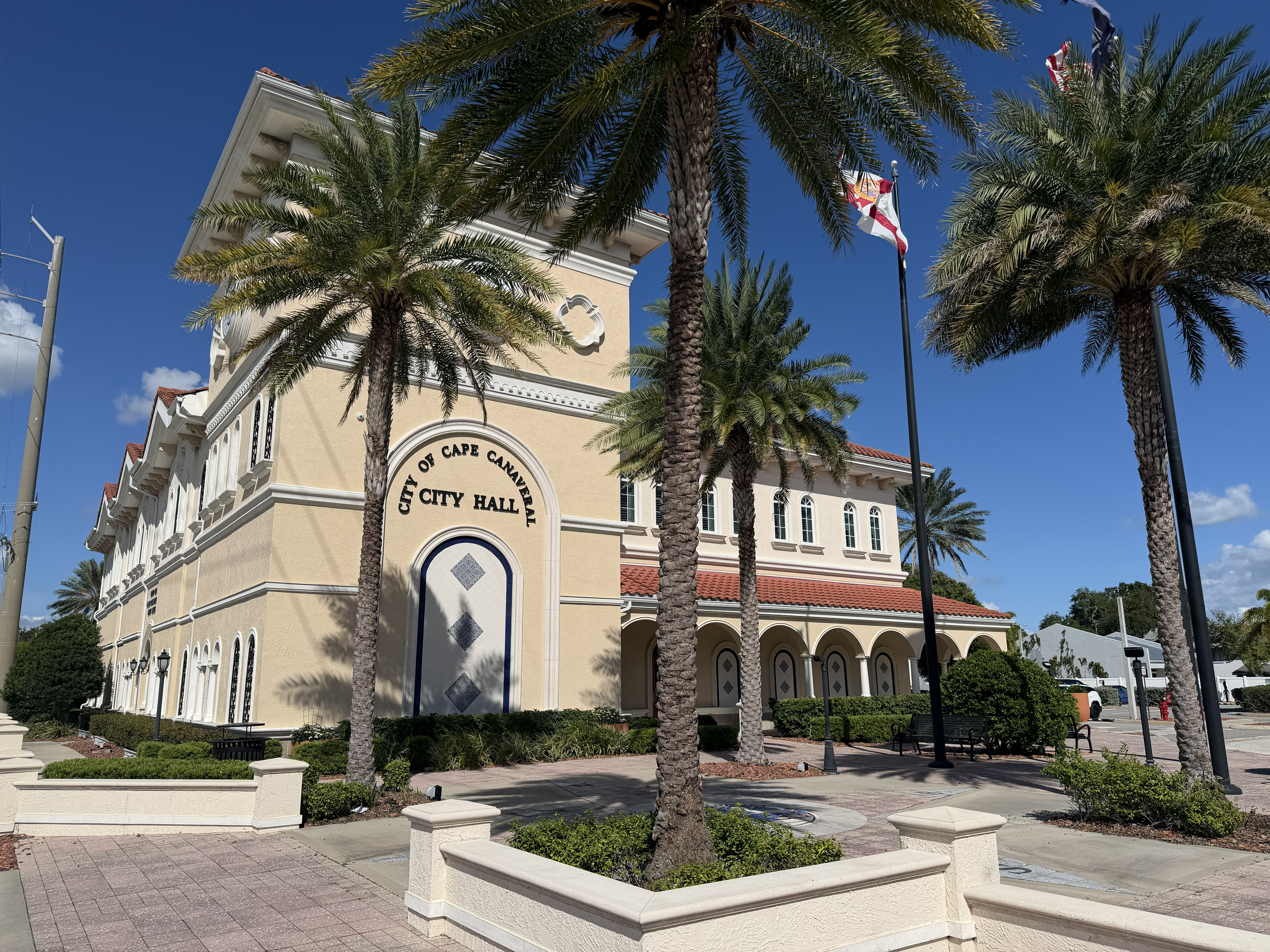
- Cape Canaveral City Hall

- Seal
- Nickname: "The Space Between" or "Space City"
- Motto: Sun, Space, and Sea
- Location in Brevard County and the state of Florida

- Location in the United States
- Coordinates: 28°23′18″N 80°36′13″W
- Country: United States
- State: Florida
- County: Brevard
- Incorporated: May 16, 1963

Government
  - Type: Council-Manager
  - Mayor: Wes Morrison
  - Mayor Pro Tem: Kay Jackson
  - Council Members: Don Willis, Tom Shoriak and Dan Coon
  - City Manager: Keith Touchberry
  - City Clerk: Amanda Bishop

Area
  - City: 2.26 sq mi (5.85 km^{2})
  - Land: 2.22 sq mi (5.75 km^{2})
  - Water: 0.039 sq mi (0.10 km^{2})
- Elevation: 9.8 ft (3 m)

Population (2020)
  - City: 9,972
  - Density: 4,487.9/sq mi (1,732.79/km^{2})
  - Metro: 543,376
- Time zone: UTC-5 (Eastern (EST))
  - Summer (DST): UTC-4 (EDT)
- ZIP code: 32920
- Area code: 321
- FIPS code: 12-10250
- GNIS feature ID: 0279995
- Website: www.capecanaveral.gov

Cape Canaveral is a city in Brevard County, Florida. It is part of the Palm Bay–Melbourne–Titusville Metropolitan Statistical Area. The population was 9,912 at the 2020 US census.

== History ==
After the establishment of a lighthouse in 1848, a few families moved into the area and a small but stable settlement was born. As the threat of Seminole Indian attacks became increasingly unlikely, other settlers began to move into the area around the Indian River. Post offices and small community stores with postal facilities were established at Canaveral, Canaveral Harbor and Artesia. It is thought the Artesia post office was so named for the ground water of artesian springs that are prevalent in the area.

In 1890, a group of alumni from Harvard University students established a hunters gun club called the Canaveral Harvard Club with a holding of over 18,000 acres (7,300 ha). Their game hunts helped clear the wilderness for other settlers to move into the area.

In the early 1920s, a group of Orlando journalists invested more than $150,000 in the beach acreage that now encompasses the area of presidentially named streets in Cape Canaveral. They called their development Journalista (now Avon-by-the-Sea) in honor of their trade. A wooden bridge linking Merritt Island with the area had just been constructed. The developers anticipated a growing number of seasonal visitors.

At that time, fishermen, retirees, and descendants of Captain Mills Burnham —the original official keeper of the Cape Canaveral Light—resided in the northern part of the present city.

Due to the hardships caused by the Great Depression, many investors defaulted on their holdings. Much of this land was recovered by newspaper owner R.B. Brossier and his son, Dickson, after they sold their Orlando home and used the remaining $4,500 to purchase much of the Avon area.

In the 1930s, archaeologists from Yale University surveyed various Native American sites in the area.

In 1951, anthropologist Irvine Rouse of Yale University visited the area and performed research.

By 1958, the workforce and the economy had grown with the space exploration program. At that time, state statute allowed an adjacent city to annex an unincorporated area without a vote of the residents. Local property owners were concerned that Cocoa Beach might annex them. Landowners felt that Cocoa Beach had more city debt and higher land taxes than they wished to support.

The City of Cape Canaveral started in 1961, when a committee was formed to incorporate. Due to paperwork delays the city charter was made into bill 167 and approved by the Florida State Legislature in Tallahassee on May 16, 1963.

In 1967, the annual Sun and Space Festival was started. It had flyovers and a parade that included a stop at the newly opened Museum of Sunken Treasure. This contained artifacts from the 1715 Treasure Fleet.

An annual celebration was started on October 9, 1990, The Patriot's Day Parade in honor of the last naval battle of the American Revolution that was fought off the Cape Canaveral coast in 1783.

In 2000, The Washington Post reported that the city's divorce rate was the highest in the country, 22%. It was the same rate in 2018.

At a Heritage Day event in March 2013 part of the festivities for the city's 50th anniversary included author Jay Barbree who delivered an oral history of the early days. On the 50th anniversary date of May 16, 2013, a 50-year time capsule was sealed and a pictorial postmark of the city's anniversary was stamped.

In 2017, the city won "Most Fit City" in the Mayor's Fitness Challenge, hosted by Health First.

== Geography ==
The city of Cape Canaveral is located on a barrier island on the Atlantic coast of Florida. It is due south of the geographical feature Cape Canaveral. It is separated from the mainland by the Banana River, Merritt Island and the Indian River from east to west.

According to the United States Census Bureau, the city has a total area of 2.3 square miles (6.0 km^{2}). 2.3 square miles (6.0 km^{2}) of it is land and 0.04 square miles (0.10 km^{2}) of it (0.85%) is water.

=== Climate ===
Cape Canaveral has a humid subtropical climate (Cfa in the Köppen climate classification). It has hot wet summers, and warm winters with moderate rainfall. In late summer and fall tropical cyclones can brush the area. On August 20, 2008, Tropical Storm Fay dropped 20.03 inches (50.9 cm) of rain.

Climate data for Cape Canaveral, Florida
Month	Jan	Feb	Mar	Apr	May	Jun	Jul	Aug	Sep	Oct	Nov	Dec	Year
Record high °F (°C)	89 (32)	92 (33)	93 (34)	97 (36)	97 (36)	101 (38)	102 (39)	101 (38)	98 (37)	96 (36)	91 (33)	90 (32)	102 (39)
Mean daily maximum °F (°C)	71 (22)	74 (23)	77 (25)	81 (27)	86 (30)	89 (32)	91 (33)	91 (33)	88 (31)	84 (29)	79 (26)	73 (23)	82 (28)
Daily mean °F (°C)	60 (16)	63 (17)	66 (19)	71 (22)	77 (25)	81 (27)	82 (28)	82 (28)	81 (27)	76 (24)	70 (21)	63 (17)	73 (23)
Mean daily minimum °F (°C)	49 (9)	52 (11)	55 (13)	60 (16)	67 (19)	72 (22)	73 (23)	73 (23)	73 (23)	68 (20)	60 (16)	53 (12)	63 (17)
Record low °F (°C)	17 (−8)	27 (−3)	25 (−4)	35 (2)	47 (8)	55 (13)	60 (16)	60 (16)	57 (14)	41 (5)	30 (−1)	21 (−6)	17 (−8)
Average precipitation inches (mm)	2.27 (58)	2.68 (68)	3.28 (83)	2.13 (54)	3.29 (84)	6.71 (170)	5.96 (151)	7.68 (195)	7.64 (194)	5.06 (129)	2.88 (73)	2.57 (65)	52.15 (1,325)
Source: TWC

== Demographics ==
Historical population
Census	Pop.	Note	%±
1970	4,258		—
1980	5,733		34.6%
1990	8,014		39.8%
2000	8,829		10.2%
2010	9,912		12.3%
2020	9,972		0.6%
U.S. Decennial Census

=== Racial and ethnic composition ===
Cape Canaveral racial composition (Hispanics excluded from racial categories) (NH = Non-Hispanic)
Race	Pop 2010	Pop 2020	% 2010	% 2020
White (NH)	8,766	8,475	88.44%	84.99%
Black or African American (NH)	221	217	2.23%	2.18%
Native American or Alaska Native (NH)	27	43	0.27%	0.43%
Asian (NH)	179	155	1.81%	1.55%
Pacific Islander or Native Hawaiian (NH)	7	6	0.07%	0.06%
Some other race (NH)	14	51	0.14%	0.51%
Two or more races/Multiracial (NH)	136	391	1.37%	3.92%
Hispanic or Latino (any race)	562	634	5.67%	6.36%
Total	9,912	9,972	100.00%	100.00%

=== 2020 census ===
As of the 2020 census, Cape Canaveral had a population of 9,972, with 5,859 households. The median age was 58.9 years; 8.0% of residents were under the age of 18 and 34.8% were 65 years of age or older. For every 100 females there were 103.4 males, and for every 100 females age 18 and over there were 102.6 males age 18 and over.

100.0% of residents lived in urban areas, while 0.0% lived in rural areas.

Of the city's households, 9.4% had children under the age of 18 living in them. Of all households, 31.9% were married-couple households, 30.0% were households with a male householder and no spouse or partner present, and 30.2% were households with a female householder and no spouse or partner present. About 47.3% of all households were made up of individuals and 19.9% had someone living alone who was 65 years of age or older. The 2020 ACS 5-year estimates reported 2,633 families in the city.

There were 8,317 housing units, of which 29.6% were vacant. The homeowner vacancy rate was 2.0% and the rental vacancy rate was 11.7%.

=== 2010 census ===
As of the 2010 United States census, there were 9,912 people, 5,431 households, and 2,684 families residing in the city.

=== 2000 census ===
As of the census of 2000, there were 8,829 people, 5,066 households, and 2,097 families residing in the city. The population density was 3,788.0 inhabitants per square mile (1,462.6/km^{2}). There were 6,641 housing units at an average density of 2,849.3 units per square mile (1,100.1 units/km^{2}). The racial makeup of the city was 94.68% White, 1.43% African American, 0.32% Native American, 1.70% Asian, 0.06% Pacific Islander, 0.42% from other races, and 1.40% from two or more races. Out of all of which Hispanics or Latinos of constituted 3.48% of the population, regardless of race.

In 2000, there were 5,066 households, out of which 11.9% had children under the age of 18 living with them, 30.7% were married couples living together, 7.4% had a female householder with no husband present, and 58.6% were non-families. 47.1% of all households were made up of individuals, and 13.8% had someone living alone who was 65 years of age or older. The average household size was 1.74 and the average family size was 2.41.

In 2000, in the city, the population was spread out, with 11.3% under the age of 18, 6.4% from 18 to 24, 30.4% from 25 to 44, 28.8% from 45 to 64, and 23.1% who were 65 years of age or older. The median age was 46 years. For every 100 females, there were 109.1 males. For every 100 females age 18 and over, there were 107.7 males.

In 2000, the median income for a household in the city was $30,858, and the median income for a family was $43,109. Males had a median income of $33,571 versus $22,423 for females. The per capita income for the city was $23,537. About 9.2% of families and 11.6% of the population were below the poverty line, including 28.7% of those under age 18 and 7.1% of those age 65 or over.

== Economy ==
Cape Canaveral has a cross section of both single family and multifamily residences. A number of hotels and time shares are located in the area. Many residents work in the service industry, engineering firms, and at the Kennedy Space Center to the north.

=== Workforce ===
In 2007, the average size of Cape Canaveral's labor force was 5,824. Of that group, 5,533 were employed and 291 were unemployed, for an unemployment rate of 5%.

=== Housing ===
In 2008, no building permits were issued. This was down from five permits for six units in 2007, which was down from 19 permits for 42 units in 2006.

The median home price in 2007 was $215,000.

=== Tourism ===
Tourism plays a major role in the economy as in any Florida beachside community. The largest hotel in Brevard County is located in the city. It has 284 rooms and 30,000 square feet (2,800 m^{2}) of meeting space.

== Government ==
Cape Canaveral is run by a council–manager government. The City Council consists of five members, including the mayor. All seats on the City Council are filled by nonpartisan election as outlined in the City Charter. The City Manager is an appointed position that acts as the city's administrative leader and carries out the council's acts and directives.

- Mayor – Wes Morrison
- Mayor Pro Tem – Mickie Kellum
- Council Member – Kim Davis
- Council Member – Kay Jackson
- Council Member – Don Willis
- City Manager (appointed) – Keith Touchberry
- City Clerk (appointed) – Esther Coulson

In 2007, the city had a taxable real estate base of $1.46 billion.

In 2009–2010, the city paid $833,100 for solid waste disposal. This was furnished at a cost from $4.95 to $7.38 monthly per residence.

Federally, Cape Canaveral is part of Florida's 8th congressional district, represented by Republican Bill Posey, elected in 2008.

=== Past Mayors ===
1. Raymond Jamieson, March 1962 – June 1963
2. Richard Thurm, June 1963 – June 1970
3. Leo Nicholas, June 1970 – June 1971
4. George Firkins Jr., June 1971 – June 1973
5. Franklyn Maclay, June 1973 – June 1976
6. Leo Nicholas, June 1976 – November 1977
7. Ann Thurm, November 1977 – June 1979
8. Johnson Murphy Jr., June 1979 – November 1982
9. Wayne Rutherford, November 1982 – November 1985
10. Patrick Lee, November 1985 – November 1988
11. Joy Salamone, November 1988 – November 1994
12. John Porter, November 1994 – November 1997
13. Rocky Randels, November 1997 – November 2015
14. Bob Hoog, November 2015 – November 2021
15. Wes Morrison, November 2021 – Present

== Infrastructure ==
=== Transportation ===
The primary transportation is by road.

- SR A1A, known officially as Astronaut Boulevard in the central and northern parts of the town and Atlantic Avenue in the southern parts, is the main road, running north–south within the city. Major intersections include George King Boulevard (diamond interchange), Central Boulevard, and Atlantic Avenue.
- SR 528 is a controlled-access highway that connects the city with the mainland. It is concurrent with SR A1A until George King Boulevard, where SR 528 then ends, and SR A1A becomes a normal surface road.

Public transportation is provided by Space Coast Area Transit (SCAT). The #9 Beach Trolley bus line circles through Cape Canaveral and runs down to Cocoa Beach and connects with other SCAT bus lines serving Brevard County.

=== Water ===
Residents obtain potable water from the city of Cocoa. A single potable water line from Cocoa runs under the Sykes Creek Bridge at Sea Ray Drive.

== Notable people ==
- Allison Anders, raised in the city, filmed Things Behind the Sun in Brevard County in 2001
- Mills O. Burnham, member of the Florida House of Representatives. Moved here in 1853 and was keeper of the Cape Canaveral Light for 30 years

== Sister cities ==
Cape Canaveral has five sister cities, as designated by Sister Cities International:

- Kloten, Zurich, Switzerland
- Sagres, Faro, Portugal
- Guidonia Montecelio, Lazio, Italy
- Fonte Nuova, Lazio, Italy
- Ithaca, Kefallinia, Greece
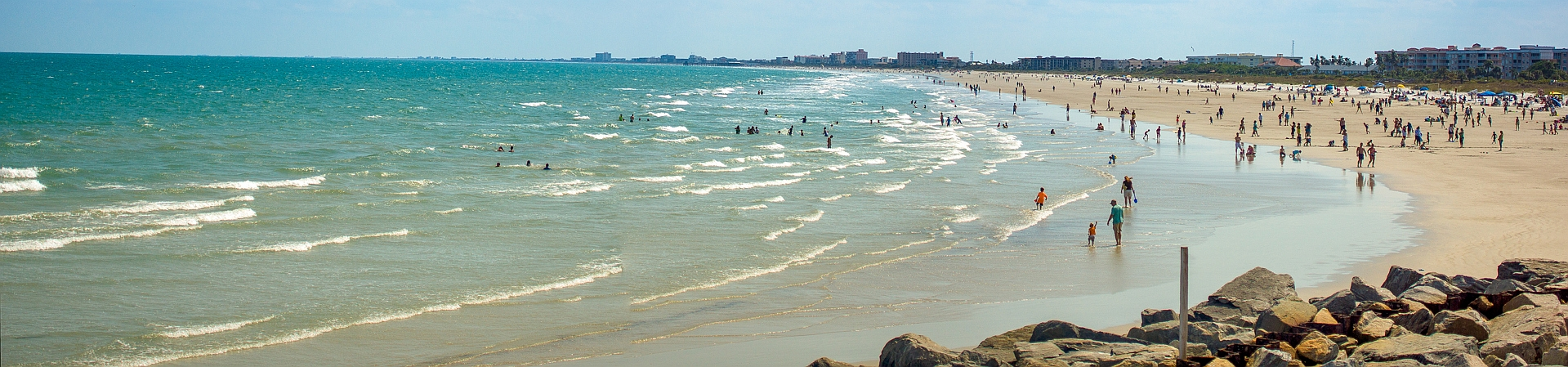
Beach in Cape Canaveral, Florida
