= Ponce de Leon Inlet Light =

Lighthouse in Florida, US

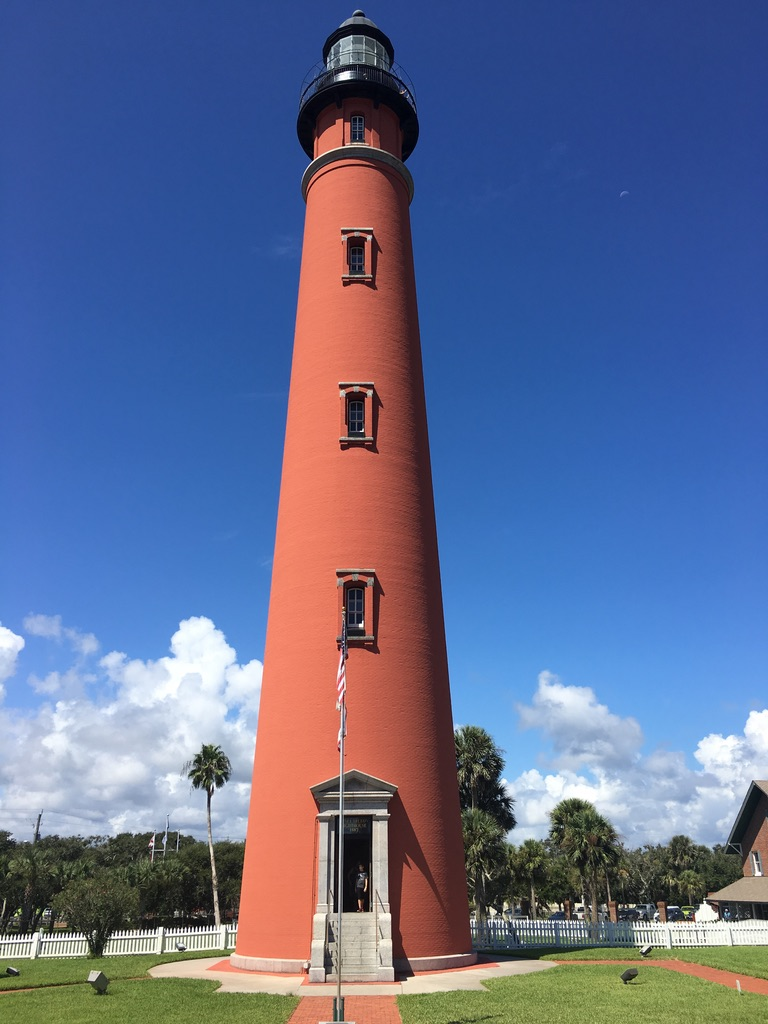
- The Mosquito Inlet Light, later known as the Ponce de Leon Inlet Light
- Location: 4931 South Peninsula Dr; Ponce de Leon Inlet; Ponce Inlet, Florida; South of Daytona
- Coordinates: 29°4′50.22″N 80°55′40.86″W

Tower
- Constructed: 1835
- Foundation: brick
- Construction: brick
- Automated: 1953
- Height: 175 feet (53 m)
- Shape: conical tower
- Heritage: National Historic Landmark, National Register of Historic Places listed place

Light
- First lit: 1887 (current structure)
- Deactivated: 1970; reactivated, 1982
- Focal height: 159 feet (48 m)
- Lens: First order Fresnel lens, 1887-1933, Third order Fresnel lens, 1933-1970 and since 2004
- Range: 17 nautical miles; 32 kilometres (20 mi)
- Characteristic: fixed light (original); Group flashing 6 times every 30 sec (current)
- Ponce De Leon Inlet Lightstation
- U.S. National Register of Historic Places
- U.S. National Historic Landmark District
- Nearest city: Ponce Inlet, Florida
- Area: 9 acres (3.6 ha)
- Built: 1887
- NRHP reference No.: 72000355

Significant dates
- Added to NRHP: September 22, 1972
- Designated NHLD: August 5, 1998

The Ponce de Leon Inlet Light is a lighthouse and museum located at Ponce de León Inlet in Central Florida. At 175 feet (53 m) in height, it is the tallest lighthouse in the state and one of the tallest in the United States (the Cape Hatteras Light in North Carolina is taller at 207 feet (63 m)). It is located between St. Augustine Light and Cape Canaveral Light. Restored by the Ponce de Leon Inlet Lighthouse Preservation Association, the lighthouse became a National Historic Landmark in 1998.

== History ==
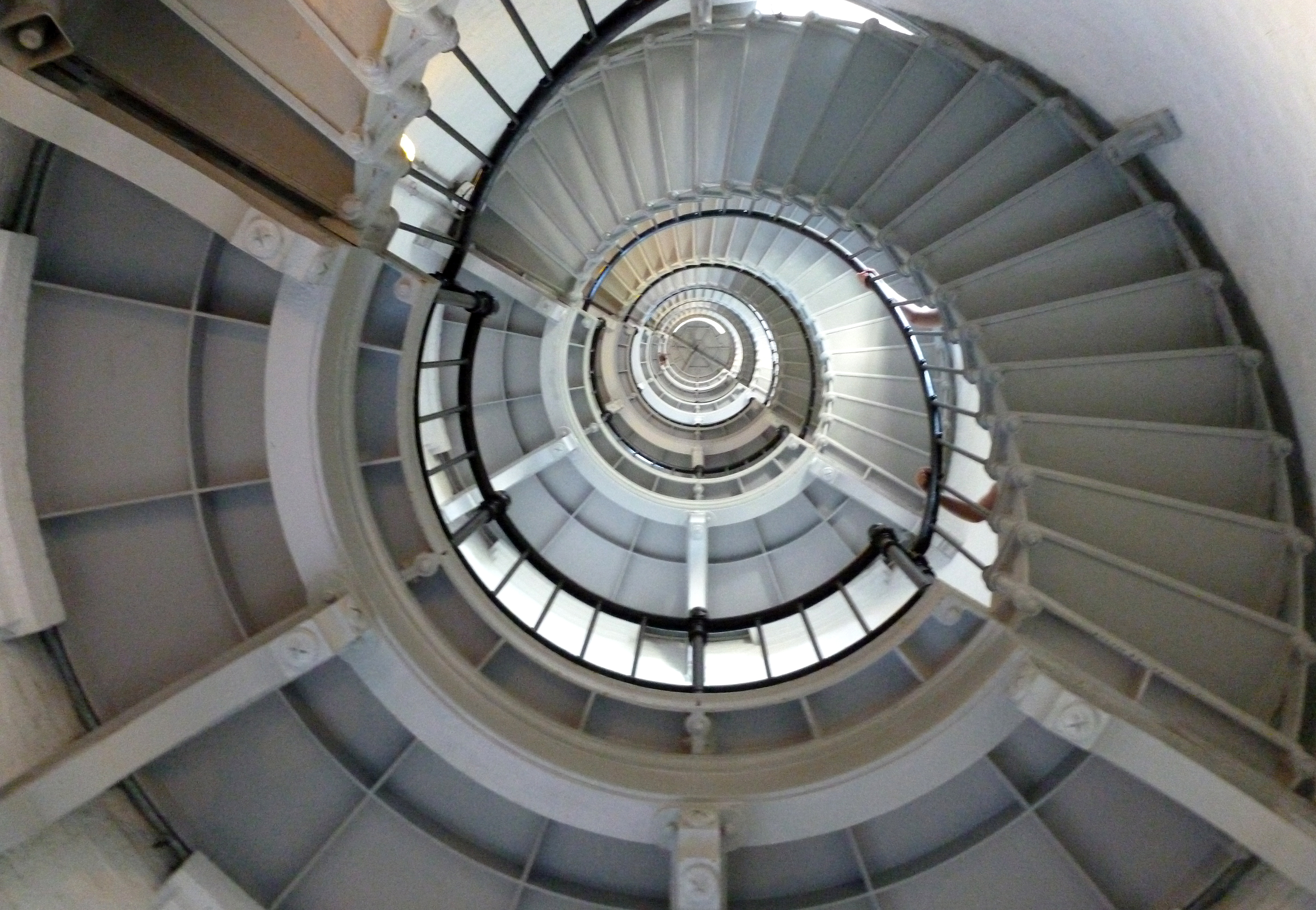
Spiral staircase inside the lighthouse

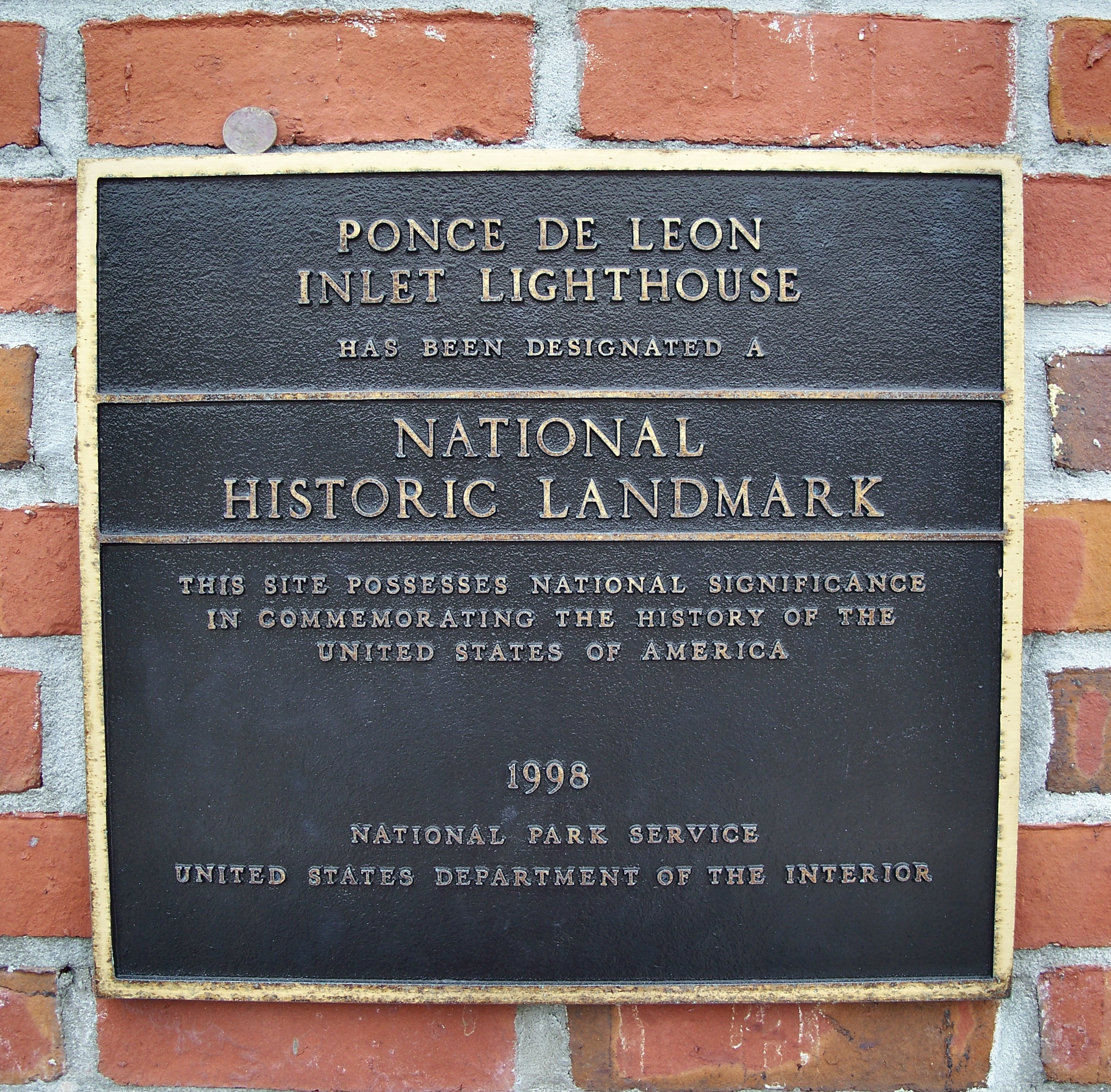
National Historic Landmark plaque

In a memorial to Congress dated March 13, 1830, the inhabitants of Mosquito County and New Smyrna requested Congress to pass a law for the erection of a light house on South side of Mosquito Inlet. The act approved June 30, 1834, provided $11,000 for building of the lighthouse.

The first lighthouse for what is now the Ponce de León Inlet was erected on the south side of Mosquito Inlet in 1835. Unfortunately, the oil for the lamp was never delivered, and soon after the tower was completed a strong storm washed much of the sand from around the base of the tower, weakening it. The Second Seminole War began soon after, and in December 1835 Seminole Indians attacked the lighthouse, smashing the glass in the lantern room and setting fire to its wooden stairs. The area was abandoned. The war prevented repairs from being made to the tower, and it collapsed the next year.

There were many shipwrecks along the coast near the Mosquito Inlet, but it was not until 1883 that another effort was begun to place a light there. Completed in 1887 and located on the north side of the inlet, the new lighthouse was based on Light-House Board standard plans with modifications made for the specific site. Construction was supervised by Chief Engineer Orville E. Babcock until his death by drowning in the Mosquito Inlet in 1884. The tower was completed and the lamp, which could be seen 17 nautical miles; 32 kilometres (20 mi) away, lit in 1887.

In 1897, author and journalist Stephen Crane was en route to cover a brewing revolt against Spanish rule in Cuba, when the ship he was on, the SS Commodore, sank off the coast of Florida. Crane escaped in a small dinghy with several crewmen, and they eventually sighted and steered for the Mosquito Inlet Light. Crane used this experience in his short story "The Open Boat".

The original lamp burned kerosene; in 1909 it was replaced with an incandescent oil vapor lamp. In 1924 a generator was installed to provide electricity in the keepers' dwellings and to pump water, replacing an old windmill pump. The lighthouse beacon was electrified in 1933 with a 500-watt lamp. The first order Fresnel lens was replaced with a third order rotating Fresnel lens at the same time.

In 1927 the name of Mosquito Inlet was changed to Ponce de Leon Inlet. The lighthouse was transferred from the abolished Lighthouse Service to the United States Coast Guard in 1939, which would oversee it for the next three decades. In 1970, the Coast Guard abandoned the old light station and established a new beacon at New Smyrna Beach. The abandoned property was then deeded to the Town of Ponce Inlet. At the urging of concerned citizens, the Town of Ponce Inlet accepted the Light Station property from the Coast Guard in 1972, and the Lighthouse Preservation Association was formed to manage the museum. That same year, the lighthouse was listed on the National Register of Historic Places.

== Present day museum ==
In 1982 the light was restored to active service, primarily because highrise buildings blocked the Coast Guard's beacon on the other side of the inlet. The Ponce De Leon Inlet Light Station was designated a National Historic Landmark on August 5, 1998, one of only eleven lighthouses to earn this designation.

The lighthouse and three keepers' dwellings have been restored, and are open to the public seven days a week. The lighthouse tower is open for climbing. The original 1867 Barbier et Fenestre first order fixed lens (installed 1887), and 1860 "Henry Lepaute" rotating first order Fresnel lens used at Cape Canaveral Light Station are all on display at the museum. The 1904 Barbier, Benard, et Turenne rotating third order Fresnel lens has been restored to service in the tower, which operates today as a private aid to navigation and is maintained by the museum staff. It is just south of Daytona Beach.

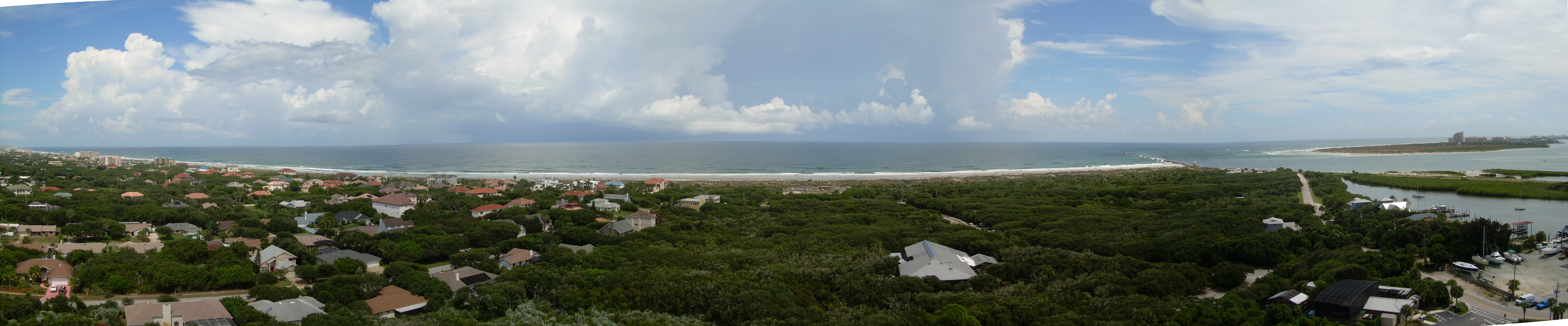
Panoramic view of the Atlantic Ocean from the observation deck
