= Face to Face (1952 film) =

1952 American anthology film

- Directed by: John Brahm; Bretaigne Windust
- Written by: James Agee; Aeneas MacKenzie
- Produced by: Huntington Hartford; Norman A. Manning; George W. Tobin
- Starring: James Mason; Gene Lockhart; Michael Pate; Robert Preston; Marjorie Steele; Minor Watson
- Cinematography: George E. Diskant (uncredited); Karl Struss (uncredited)
- Edited by: Otto Meyer
- Music by: Hugo Friedhofer (uncredited)
- Distributed by: RKO Radio Pictures
- Release dates: November 14, 1952; January 13, 1952 (New York)
- Running time: 89 minutes
- Country: United States
- Language: English

Face to Face is a 1952 anthology film adapted from the stories "The Secret Sharer" by Joseph Conrad and "The Bride Comes to Yellow Sky" by Stephen Crane. The film was produced by A&P heir Huntington Hartford and released by RKO Radio Pictures.

== Plot ==
=== "The Secret Sharer" ===
This segment was directed by John Brahm and adapted by Æneas MacKenzie. It stars James Mason and Gene Lockhart.

=== "The Bride Comes to Yellow Sky" ===
This segment was adapted by James Agee and directed by Bretaigne Windust. It stars Robert Preston, Marjorie Steele and Minor Watson. Agee also appears in the film in the part of the town drunk.

== Reception ==
In a contemporary review for The New York Times, critic Howard Thompson wrote: "Having chosen to tell a story, Mr. Hartford and a small, perfectly tuned team are telling it well. ... The two selections could hardly be more antithetical in content." Thompson called "The Bride Comes to Yellow Sky" segment "a gem of its kind" and evocative of High Noon.

== See also ==
- List of American films of 1952
