= Marine Science Center =

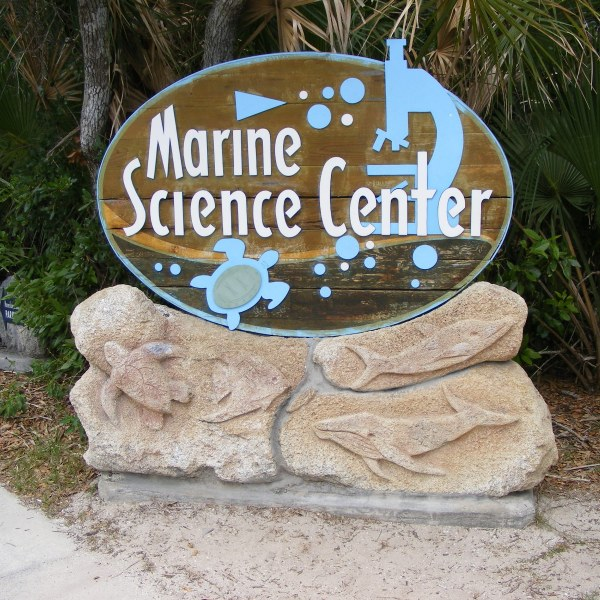
- Marine Science Center signage

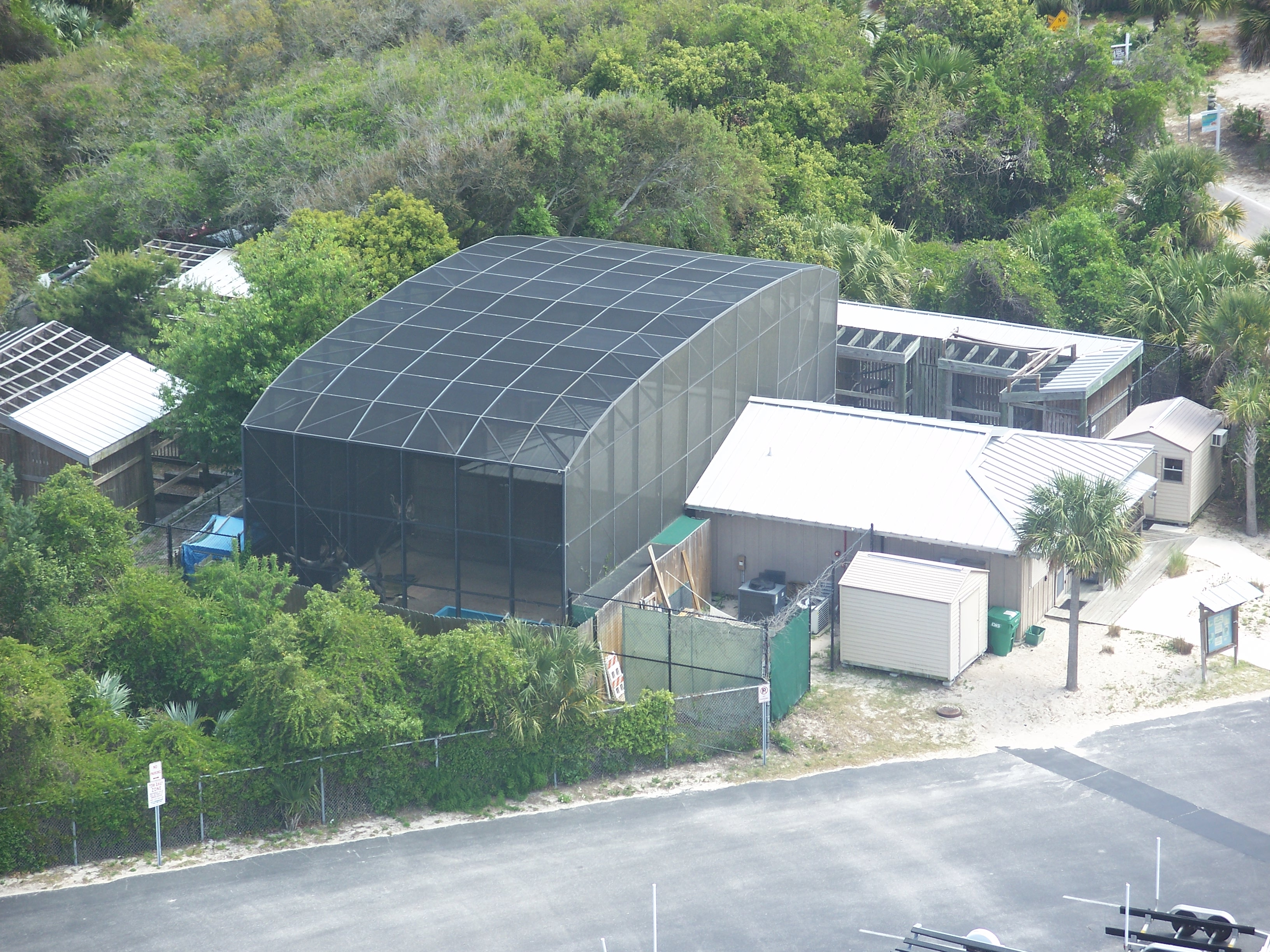
- Aerial photo of the Marine Science Center
- Interactive map of Marine Science Center
- 29°04′51″N 80°55′34″W
- Date opened: 2002
- Location: 100 Lighthouse Drive, Ponce Inlet, Fl 32127
- Website: marinesciencecenter.com

The Volusia County Marine Science Center is a marine science and natural history museum in Ponce Inlet, Volusia County, Florida.

== Exhibition ==
The center exhibits includes a humpback whale skull, freshwater turtles, turtle rehabilitation area, a 4,876 gallon hexagonal artificial reef aquarium and stingray touch pool with cownose rays.

== Rehabilitation center ==
The Center also works to rehabilitate injured seabirds and sea turtles.
