= SS Commodore =

Wrecked American steamboat

Coordinates: 29°12.23′N 80°46.44′W

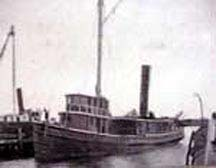
- SS Commodore at dock

History
- Launched: 1882
- Fate: Wrecked 1897

General characteristics
- Tonnage: 178 tons
- Length: 122.5 ft (37.3 m)
- Beam: 21 ft (6.4 m)
- Draft: 9 ft (2.7 m)
- Installed power: Coal-fired

SS Commodore was an American steamboat that was wrecked off the coast of Florida on 2 January 1897, while en route to Cuba. The event was immortalized when passenger and author Stephen Crane, who was traveling as a war correspondent for the Bacheller-Johnson syndicate, wrote the classic short story "The Open Boat" about his experience.

== Sinking ==
The ship sailed from Jacksonville, Florida, with 27 or 28 men and a cargo of supplies and ammunition for Cuban rebels, on New Year's Eve, 1896. On the St. Johns River, less than 2 miles (3 km) from Jacksonville, Commodore struck a sandbar in a dense fog and damaged its hull. Although towed off the sandbar the following day, it was again beached in Mayport, Florida, and further damaged. A leak began in the boiler room that evening, and as a result of malfunctioning water pumps, the ship came to a standstill about 16 miles (26 km) from Mosquito Inlet (now called Ponce de León Inlet). As the ship took on more water, Crane described the engine room as resembling "a scene at this time taken from the middle kitchen of Hades."

Commodore's lifeboats were lowered in the early hours of the morning on January 2, 1897, and the ship sank at 7 a.m. Crane was one of the last to leave the ship in a 10-foot (3.0 m) dinghy. He and three other men (including the captain, Edward Murphy, an oiler named Billie Higgins and the cook, Charles B. Montgomery) floundered off the coast of Florida for a day and a half before attempting to land their craft at Daytona Beach. The small boat, however, overturned in the surf, forcing the exhausted men to swim to shore; one of them, Billie Higgins, died. The disaster was front-page news in newspapers across the country; rumors that the ship had been sabotaged were widely circulated but never substantiated.

== Finding the Wreck ==
During 2002-2004 three seasons of archaeological investigation were begun in order to archaeologically document the exposed remains and to definitively identify the vessel. The results of this fieldwork were eventually incorporated into a Master's Thesis produced by Kimberly Eslinger Faulk, then a graduate student at East Carolina University's Maritime Studies Program. For two weeks in May 2002, Faulk, a crew of technical divers from the Cambrian Foundation, representatives of PILHA and videographer Rick Allen from Nautilus Productions completed the first archaeological survey of the wreck site. In keeping with the Light House's mission of protecting the wreck site and better interpreting its importance to the people of Ponce Inlet and Daytona Beach, Florida project parameters were laid out for a professional archaeological survey of the site. Nautilus Productions provided video mosaic services, site documentation and recorded survey and diving activities on site. Later in 2004 scientists from the Lighthouse Archaeological Maritime Program (LAMP) at the St. Augustine Lighthouse & Museum offered their assistance to PILPA in their ongoing investigation of the vessel remains and visited the shipwreck site for a series of dives on April 7, 2004. The recording of the engine remains by LAMP divers resulted in measurements of a 26-inch bore and a 30-inch stroke. These dimensions are a perfect match with the schematics for the single-expansion steam engine built by the Neafie & Levy yard in Philadelphia as listed in the 1882 survey produced when Commodore was first registered. This data and the accumulated evidence finally substantiated the identification of this sunken vessel as Commodore beyond a reasonable doubt.
