= Fiesta del Pacifico =

Civic festival in San Diego, California (1950s)

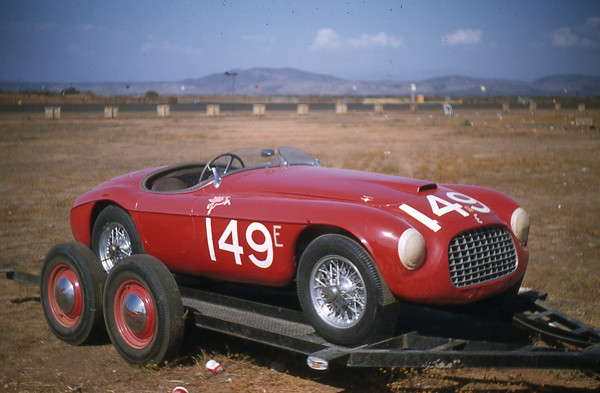
- 1948 Ferrari at San Diego Montgomery Field, where it was raced by Bob Drake, as part of the road races during the city's Fiesta Del Pacifico festival.
- Status: defunct
- Genre: Civic festival, Cultural festival
- Date: Mid to late summer
- Frequency: Annual (1956–1959)
- Venue: Various locations in San Diego, California
- Locations: San Diego, California, U.S.
- Years active: 1956–1959
- Inaugurated: 1956
- Most recent: 1959
- Participants: Local performers, 1,300 cast members (for The California Story)

Fiesta del Pacifico (transl. Festival of the Pacific) was a civic festival held in San Diego, California, during the 1950s. The event was staged throughout the city for several weeks in the mid to late summer. It was intended to attract tourists and to highlight San Diego's Spanish and Mexican heritage.

== History ==
In 1955, the San Diego City Council approved a plan for a month-long celebration to take place in the summer of 1956. A private organization run by Wayne Dailard, who had served as manager of the 1935–36 California Pacific International Exposition, put on a 33-day-long event in 1956, with some financial support from the city and county. It was intended to be an annual event, but revenue projections fell short, and tourism industry representatives complained that it was drawing traffic away from the more established attractions. The festival continued for three more years but was shorter and less ambitious each year: July 18 to August 12 in 1956, July 24 to August 10 in 1957, August 29 to September 9 in 1958, and September 4 to 17 in 1959. After 1959, the event was abandoned.

== Description ==
The festival included weeks of varied activities throughout the city, including a beauty pageant, several parades, a series of road races, a rodeo, street parties, and multiple displays of dancing, art, and other cultural activities. The main event was an epic theatrical production entitled The California Story, which had originally been written for the California Centennial celebration in 1950 and had been presented in the Hollywood Bowl. The extravaganza was performed in Balboa Stadium on a stage as long as a city block. It featured 35 scenes and a cast of 1,300 people, including a symphony orchestra and a 150-voice choir. Lucille Norman was the star and lead singer in the 1957 production. It was directed by Vladimir Rosing and conducted by Meredith Willson; both had filled the same role at the Hollywood Bowl. The production dramatized the history of California from the arrival of Juan Rodríguez Cabrillo in 1540 through the early 20th century. It was billed as "the biggest non-movie spectacle ever produced anywhere." In 1959, the last year of the fiesta, the California Story production was replaced by a 2-hour show called Stars over Pacific.

== Legacy ==
The celebration inspired the most popular and most-performed work by composer Roger Nixon: a piece for symphonic band called Fiesta del Pacifico. It was composed in 1958–59 and first performed in 1960. Nixon explained the name of his composition as follows: "Fiesta del Pacifico is held in San Diego and features a play on the history of the area, a parade, a rodeo, and street dances. It is one of several festivals held annually in various communities in California that celebrate the Old Spanish Days of the State, and I chose its name as representative of the spirit of those occasions."
