= The Bride Comes to Yellow Sky =

- Short story by Stephen Crane
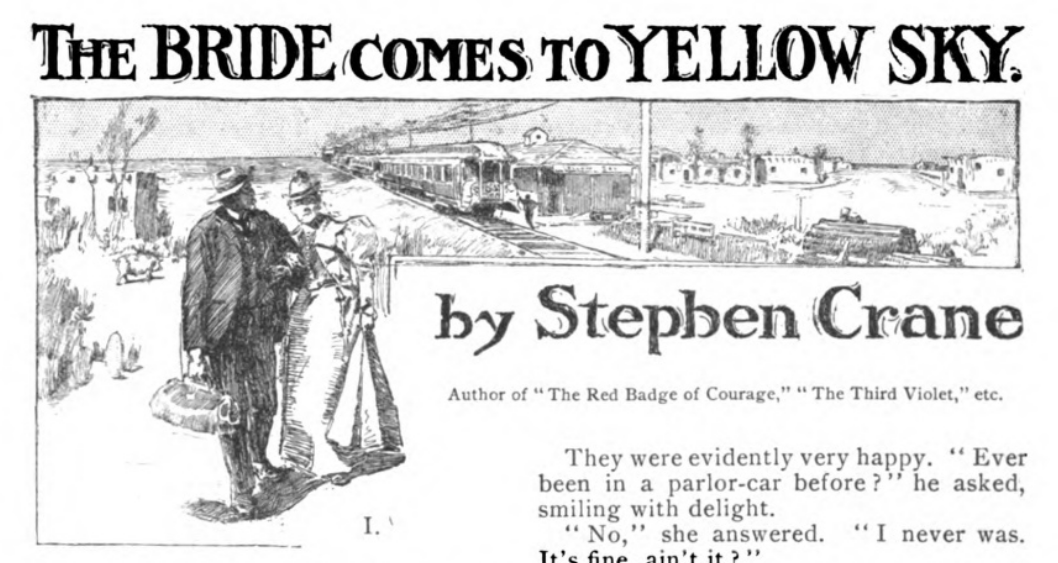
- The opening illustration as it appeared in McClure's
- Language: English
- Genre: Western

Publication
- Published in: McClure's Magazine
- Publication date: February, 1898

"The Bride Comes to Yellow Sky" is an 1898 western short story by American author Stephen Crane (1871–1900). Originally published in the February, 1898 issue of McClure's Magazine, it was written in England. The story's protagonist is a Texas marshal named Jack Potter, who is returning to the town of Yellow Sky with his eastern bride. Potter's nemesis, the gunslinger Scratchy Wilson, drunkenly plans to accost the sheriff after he disembarks the train, but he changes his mind upon seeing the unarmed man with his bride.

The short story inspired a 1967 opera of the same name by Roger Nixon, and the 1952 film Face to Face.

== Author ==
Stephen Crane was an American author born on November 1, 1871, in Newark, New Jersey, who died on June 5, 1900, from tuberculosis. At the time of his death he was living in Germany. According to Encyclopædia Britannica, "He is known for being a novelist, poet, and short-story writer, best known for his novels Maggie: A Girl of the Streets (1893) and The Red Badge of Courage (1895) and the short stories 'The Open Boat', 'The Bride Comes to Yellow Sky', and 'The Blue Hotel'".

== Plot summary ==
=== I ===
The short story opens in a parlor car of a train traveling westward from San Antonio towards a late-nineteenth-century Texas town named Yellow Sky. In this section a couple of characters are introduced—Jack Potter, and his bride. Newly married in San Antonio, "They were evidently very happy". "The bride was not pretty, nor was she very young. She wore a dress of blue cashmere, with small reservations of velvet here and there, and with steel blue buttons abounding". Jack Potter is then described briefly as the Marshal of Yellow Sky. He is "...a man known, liked, and feared in his corner, a prominent person...". Further into chapter one, Potter is getting more and more anxious while approaching his town, as his marriage would be ill received by the community. "In San Antonio he was a man hidden in the dark. A knife to sever any friendly duty, any form, was easy to his hand in that remote city. But the hour of Yellow Sky—the hour of daylight—was approaching". The section ends with Potter and his wife stepping off the train and fleeing the scene.

=== II ===
Section two begins in the setting of a bar in Yellow Sky called the Weary Gentlemen saloon. It introduces a few more characters in the first couple sentences. "One was a salesman, who talked a great deal and rapidly; three were Texans who did not care to talk at the time; and two were Mexican sheep-herders, who did not talk as a general practice in the Weary Gentlemen saloon". In the fourth paragraph a young man appears in the doorway of the saloon and says "Scratchy Wilson's drunk, and has turned loose with both hands". The drummer isn't aware of who Scratchy Wilson is, but when the barkeeper closes the shutters and locks the door, the drummer begins asking the barkeeper questions. The barkeeper answers his questions by stating "You see, this here Scratchy Wilson is a wonder with a gun—a perfect wonder; and when he goes on the war trail, we hunt our holes—naturally. He's about the last one of the old gang that used to hang out along the river here. He's a terror when he's drunk. When he's sober he's all right—kind of simple—wouldn't hurt a fly—nicest fellow in town. But when he's drunk—whoo!". The plot of the second section is to add some rising suspense for chapter three when Scratchy Wilson appears.

=== III ===
This section is solely about Scratchy Wilson. "A man in a maroon-colored flannel shirt" and childlike red and gold boots are walking up the main street of Yellow Sky carrying a revolver. He is yelling throughout the town with a voice "that seemed to have no relation to the ordinary vocal strength of a man". This man is the drunk Scratchy Wilson, and he is in search of a fight. When Scratchy approaches the door to the saloon, he comes into contact with the bartender's dog. The dog starts to walk away from Scratchy, he yells at it, and it starts to sprint. He starts shooting at the dog, missing both times but forcing the dog to flee in a new direction. He now turns his attention to the saloon door and pounds on it with his revolver demanding to be served a drink. He becomes infuriated, no one is letting him in, so he stabs some paper into the door and shoots at it. While walking back down the main street, the name Jack Potter comes to Scratchy's mind. He goes to the house of his "ancient antagonist" and demands he come out and fight, becoming more and more enraged that Sheriff Potter is not answering him.

=== IV ===
Sheriff Jack Potter and his bride walk around the corner to his house. There, they come face to face with Scratchy Wilson reloading his revolver. He sees the Sheriff, drops his gun and pulls a fresh one from his holster. Scratchy believes that Jack is going to attack him from behind. Sheriff Potter informs Scratchy that he was unarmed and would not be fighting him tonight. Being from the old west where everyone carries a gun, Scratchy does not believe Jack has no gun with him. The Sheriff tells him that he does not have his weapon because he was just married in San Antonio. Scratchy, in disbelief, sees Jack's new wife standing next to him on the street and instantly breaks his rage. He sinks his head and walks away leaving the bride and groom in peace.

== Characters ==
- Jack Potter: The marshal of Yellow Sky. "A conscientious man who takes his job seriously- too seriously, perhaps. He assumes that the townsfolk consider his role central to their safe existence and that they will feel he has let them down when they learn that he has married". "Like Scratchy, Jack is a relic of a time passed, but his marriage marks his relinquishment of his mythic role as the solitary western marshal".
- Bride: "Jack's wife is given no name, signifying for many critics her role as a faceless representative of the institution of marriage, just one of many vestiges of eastern civilization that have made their way to Yellow Sky". "... she displays a shyness, clumsiness, and lack of sophistication that is noted by the other travelers, who immediately recognize her lower-class status". "Crane uses a mock heroic style to describe the wife's fascinated horror on seeing the gun-toting Scratchy".
- Drummer: The drummer is seen in the Saloon along with a handful of other men drinking and carrying away. "Like other characters in Crane's fiction, he is a sober and rational (though perhaps overly talkative) representative of the East and is innocent of frontier ways; he is surprised to learn that such anachronistic characters as Scratchy still exist. The drummer plays a practical role in the plot because he is an outsider who needs to be educated about Yellow Sky, thereby providing a reason to include an explanation of Scratchy's background and nature".
- Scratchy Wilson: When researching, if you come across the definition of the word "scratchy" you will find that it's usually talking about a certain fabric but it basically means to cause discomfort by having a rough or itchy feel. In the story, Scratchy never really harms anyone. Yes, he does aim his gun and fire at dormant objects but he never truly hurts anyone, he just causes discomfort. "Although he plays the part of an old-style frontier character, the truth is that his flannel shirt was made in an eastern factory and his boots are the same kind coveted by schoolboys". "His role as the mythic western cowboy and rogue has changed, just as Jack's role has changed, but he has no new role to assume and thus particularly pathetic as he trudges away at the end of the story".
- The Negro Waiters: Waiters in white suits working on the dining car of the train. They lead the newlywed couple through the dinner, while subtly condescending them.
- Mexican Sheep-Herders: Patrons of the Weary Gentleman saloon. Leave out the back door of the saloon upon hearing of Scratchy Wilson's antics.
- Young Man: A young male resident of Yellow Sky. Warns the town and patrons of the Weary Gentlemen.

== Analysis ==
The short story "The Bride Comes to Yellow Sky" is written to show the vast incline of society for the West. Paul Sorrentino, a published essay writer, wrote about the correlation between the name Jack Potter and a political figure for Texas named Robert Potter. Robert Potter signed the Texas Declaration of Independence. "In 1888 Archibald Clavering Gunter combined the exploits of various Potters from Texas in his enormously best selling novel Mr. Potter of Texas, a romantic adventure about a Mr. Sampson Potter, the stereotypical rugged frontiersman with the clichéd heart of gold, who had been a ranger, Congressman, cattleman, and sheriff". "By the time that Crane wrote 'The Bride Comes to Yellow Sky' in 1897 about a Texas marshal named Jack Potter, the names Potter and Texas Jack were legendary symbols of the self-made frontiersman who helped pave the west for the advance of civilization. From Scratchy Wilson's point of view, however, this advancement had not yet occurred".

== Point of view ==
"The Bride Comes to Yellow Sky" is written in a third-person omniscient point of view with an omniscient narrator. "The narrator is 'all-knowing' and 'can move from place to place.... slipping into and out of characters'". We as readers only follow a handful of characters and are always told what they say; never hearing their internal dialogue. We also get back stories of certain things that only an omnipotent narrator could know, "...Maroon-colored flannel shirt, which had been purchased for purpose of decoration, and made principally by some Jewish woman on the east side of New York".

== Symbolism ==
- Jack Potter – The Sheriff/Marshal is unique in that he is one of only two named characters in the story. Stephen Crane chose his name with purpose. He is a wild west sheriff and yet has the bland name of Jack Potter, the opposite of what one would expect from a Texas marshal. "By the 1890s, dead or retired were the marshals with such colorful names as Wyatt Earp, Wild Bill Hickok, and Bat Masterson". The surname Potter is also a reference to a Potter's Field. "Traditionally a graveyard for the homeless and friendless". Yellow Sky is Marshal Potter's field, watching over the dying West.
- Yellow Sky – The entire town of Yellow Sky is a symbol, its name alone is "indicative of sunsets and death... one huge cemetery for dying westerners"
- Scratchy Wilson – One of only two named characters in the story, Scratchy Wilson is the last old west gang member in town. His first name is one that makes him a demon like character. "'Old Scratch' is a traditional nickname for the Devil. The 'y' suffix of 'Scratchy' however – deflates Wilson's demonism". He is seen in section III as a man dressed in a maroon shirt and red boots.These colors are classic representations of the Devil and help to present him as demon like. The name Scratchy also indicates of something that is irritating. The town finds his antics annoying but sees him as a mild threat.
- The Train – It acts as a device to transport the east west. Trains in the mid-1800s opened the West and made it what it was. Towns would spring up all along the railways and lead to plentiful western settlements in these locations. The trains birthed these towns even though "from the start [they] were condemned...predicted to be failures." This train, however, is bringing the death of Yellow Sky. Bringing salesmen, eastern clothing, and ultimately eastern ways of life, it is killing the Old West and replacing it with something else.
- The Bride – Stephen Crane does not give her a name, only The Bride or Mrs. Potter. Stephen Crane makes her, as an individual, meaningless. She "matters only as a representative of the new Eastern order". In the final scene of the story, she stops Scratchy Wilson from continuing his rampage, not as herself, but as an idea. Seeing her as incoming change, not to him personally but to the town and to Sheriff Potter, Wilson breaks down to a childlike state in the face of her and the inevitability of his way of life dying: "Well, I 'low it's off Jack," said Wilson. He was looking at the ground. "Married!" He was not a student of chivalry; it was merely that in the presence of this foreign condition he was a simple child on the earlier plains. He picked up his starboard revolver, and, placing both weapons in their holsters, he went away. His feet made funnel-shaped tracks in the heavy sand.

== Theme ==
Meyers calls theme "the central idea or meaning of a story. It provides a unifying point around which the plot, characters, setting, point of view, symbols, and other elements of the story are organized." The theme of "The Bride Comes to Yellow Sky" is "the dying of the sentimentalized West with the encroachment of the lifestyle of the civilized East". The old west, that once was, is fading and very little is left. Scratchy Wilson is a leftover of that time. He was once a member of a wild west gang; now he is just a childlike drunk residing outside of town. Moreover, even though Scratchy is a symbol of a bygone era, he has been changed. He wears clothing from "some Jewish woman on the East Side of New York" and boots that were "beloved in winter by little sledding boys". These items that he wears are not things you would find in Texas; they were likely brought in by salesmen or drummers into the town from the East. Scratchy is but a child and when faced with change that he is not ready for, he cowers back to his home with his head sunken.

== Setting ==
The story takes place in three main locations in the late 1800s: the train, the Weary Gentleman saloon, and outside Sheriff Jack Potter's house. The train and saloon help to set the period, a time when trains are a major form of transportation and in Yellow Sky's case, one of the only ways to get there. The saloon acts as a way to give insight and backstory to the two main characters, Jack and Scratchy. We get a perspective on the two from side characters in the story. The Sheriff's house, an immovable object in Scratchy's warpath, is the final scene of the story. Presently there came the spectacle of a madman churning himself into deepest rage over the immobility of a house. He fumed at it as the winter wind attacks a prairie cabin in the North. To the distance, there should have gone the sound of a tumult like the fighting of two hundred Mexicans. As necessity bade him, he paused for breath or to reload his revolvers.

== Imagery ==
Crane uses a vast amount of imagery in the story, for example; "...Crane used nautical imagery in 'The Bride Comes to Yellow Sky' as a visual reminder of this westward movement. In the passenger-car with its "sea-green figured velvet", a waiter, like a "pilot," is "steering [Potter and his bride] through their meal". Contemplating the best way to sneak into Yellow Sky undetected, Potter envisions himself as a boat, "a plains-craft" – to use a phrase invented by Crane. In the past, when Scratchy terrorized the town, Potter "would sail in and pull out all the kinks in this thing", though this time the boat-like Potter encounters resistance as he and his bride, like two boat sails, "put forth the efforts of a pair walking bowed against a strong wind". Confronted with the stormy Scratchy, the bride becomes a "drowning woman" and Potter, despite attempts to maintain his course of direction, is "stiffening and steadying" while "a vision of the Pullman floated" in his mind as a symbol of his new condition. After Scratchy reluctantly accepts the end of the childlike drama that he and the marshal have repeatedly enacted in the past, he picks up his "starboard revolver", "his throat [working] like a pump" of a steamboat, and drifts away, his feet creating the "funnel-shaped tracks" that form the wake of a boat symbolizing the funeral wake commemorating the passing of the frontier.

== Sources ==
- Howes, Kelly King. Characters in 19th-Century Literature. Detroit : Gale Research, 1993, pp. 143–144.
- Meyer, Michael, editor. The Bedford Introduction to Literature. 10th ed., Bedford/St. Martin's, 2013.
- Sorrentino, Paul (2007). "Stephen Crane's Sources and Allusions in 'The Bride Comes to Yellow Sky' and 'Moonlight on the Snow'". American Literary Realism. 40 (1): 52–65. doi:10.1353/alr.2008.0016. JSTOR 27747272. S2CID 162228789.
- The Editors of Encyclopædia Britannica. "Stephen Crane. American Writer." Encyclopaedia Britannica, 18 Aug. 2017, www.britannica.com/biography/Stephen-Crane. Accessed 18 September 2017.
- Petry, Alice Hall (October 1983). "Crane's The Bride Comes to Yellow Sky". The Explicator. 42 (1): 45–47. doi:10.1080/00144940.1983.9939394.
- Meyers, Michael. The Bedford Introduction to Literature: Reading, Thinking, Writing, 10th ed., Bedford/St. Martin's, 2013 pp. 215–217 296
- Hudson, John (January 1, 1982). "Towns Of The Western Railroads". Great Plains Quarterly.
