= Roger Nixon =

American classical composer

Roger Alfred Nixon (August 8, 1921 – October 13, 2009) was an American composer, musician, and professor of music. He wrote over sixty compositions for orchestra, band, choir and opera. Nixon received many awards and honors for his works, many of which demonstrate a feel for the rhythms and dances of the early settlers of his native state of California.

== Biography ==
Nixon was born and raised in California's Central Valley in Tulare and Modesto. He attended Modesto Junior College from 1938–1940 where he studied clarinet with Frank Mancini, formerly of John Philip Sousa's band. He continued his studies at UC Berkeley, majoring in composition and receiving a Bachelor of Arts degree in 1941. His studies were then interrupted by four years of active duty in the Navy during World War II, serving as the commanding officer of an LCMR in the Atlantic.

Following the war, Nixon returned to UC Berkeley, first receiving a M.A. degree and later a Ph.D. His primary teacher was Roger Sessions, but he also studied with Arthur Bliss, Ernest Bloch, Charles Cushing, and Frederick Jacobi. In the summer of 1948, he studied privately with Arnold Schoenberg.

From 1951 to 1959, Nixon was on the music faculty at Modesto Junior College. He was then appointed to the faculty at San Francisco State College, now San Francisco State University. In 1960, he began a long association with the school's Symphonic Band, which premiered many of his works. Most of Nixon's works are for band, but he has also composed for orchestra, chamber ensembles, solo piano, choral ensembles; he also composed song cycles and an opera. His most popular and most-performed work is Fiesta del Pacifico, a piece for concert band.

Nixon received several awards, including a Phelan Award, the Neil A. Kjos Memorial Award, and five grants from the National Endowment for the Arts. He was elected to the American Bandmasters Association in 1973, the same year he won the association's Ostwald Award for his composition Festival Fanfare March. In 1997, Nixon was honored by the Texas Bandmasters Association as a Heritage American Composer. At his death, he was Professor Emeritus of Music at San Francisco State University.

His students at San Francisco State University included Kent Nagano.

Nixon died on October 13, 2009 of leukemia at Mills Peninsula Hospital in Burlingame, California.

== Selected works ==
Stage

- The Bride Comes to Yellow Sky, Opera in 4 scenes (1967); libretto by Ray Benedict West, Jr. adapted from the short story by Stephen Crane

Orchestra

- Air for Strings for string orchestra (1948)
- Mooney's Grove Suite (1964, revised 1967)
- Three Dances (1962)
- Overture

Concertante

- Concerto for violin and orchestra (1950s)
- Reflections for flute and band (1965)
- Elegiac Rhapsody for viola and orchestra; initially composed as a separate work, used as movement II of the Viola Concerto
- Concerto for viola and orchestra (1969)
- Two Elegies for solo cello and cello ensemble (1978, 1984)

Concert band

- Music of Appreciation (1944, premiered 1992, published 1994)
- Elegy and Fanfare-March (1958, revised 1967)
- Fiesta del Pacifico (1960)
- Prelude and Fugue (1961)
- San Joaquin Sketches (1962, revised 1982)
- Nocturne (1965)
- Reflections (1965)
- Centennial Fanfare-March (1970); composed for the centennial of the founding of Modesto, California
- A Solemn Processional (published 1971)
- Festival Fanfare-March (1971); received the 1973 Ostwald Award of the American Bandmasters Association
- Psalm (1972, revised 1979)
- Music for a Civic Celebration (1975)
- Pacific Celebration Suite (1976)
- Chamarita! (1981)
- Academic Tribute (1982, published 1987)
- California Jubilee (1984)
- Arises the New Flower (1985)
- Flower of Youth (1988, published 1992)
- A Centennial Overture (1995)
- A Lyric Remembrance (1997)
- Las Vegas Holiday (2001)
- Monterey Holidays (2001)
- Mondavi Fanfare

Brass

- Ceremonial Fanfare No. 1 for brass (1976)
- Ceremonial Piece for brass (1976, published 1980); composed for Bicentennial of America
- Concert Prelude for brass (1982–1988)

Chamber music

- String Quartet (1949)
- Nocturne for flute and piano (1960)
- Four Duos for flute or oboe (or violin) and clarinet (or viola) (1966)
- Movement for clarinet and piano (1975)
- Variations for bass clarinet (1978)
- Conversations for violin and clarinet (1981)
- Variations for bassoon (1982, published 1983)
- Duo (Dialog) for flute and alto flute (published 1982)
- Two Duos for piccolo and E♭ clarinet (or flute) (published 1982)
- Three Duos for flute and clarinet (1983)
- Music for Clarinet and Piano, 5 Movements (1986)
- Variations for clarinet and cello (1991)

Piano

- Five Piano Preludes (1946)
- Twelve Preludes (1984)
- Music for Piano (1994)
- Twenty-Four Preludes (1946–2000)

Vocal

- Chinese Seasons, Song Cycle for soprano and piano (1942); words from The Hundred Names
- Six Moods of Love, Song Cycle for soprano and piano (1940s?)

1. I Am Dark and Fair to See; anonymous words
2. I Am in Love with High, Farseeing Places; words by Arthur Davison Ficke
3. Grief, Find the Words; words by Philip Sidney
4. It Was a Quiet Way; words by Emily Dickinson
5. Psalm to My Beloved; words by Eunice Tietjens
6. A Decade; words by Amy Lowell

- Gliding o'er All for voice and piano (1972); words by Walt Whitman
- A Narrative of Tides, Song Cycle for mezzo-soprano, flute and piano (1984); words from A Ring of Willows by Eric Barker
- Three Transcendental Songs on Poems by Walt Whitman for mezzo-soprano and piano (1979)

Choral

- Firwood for mixed chorus a cappella (1960); words by John Clare
- Now Living Things for mixed chorus a cappella (1961); words by Leonard Nathan
- The Wind for mixed chorus a cappella (published 1962); words from A Child's Garden of Verses by Robert Louis Stevenson
- Swallows for mixed chorus a cappella (1963); words by Robert Louis Stevenson
- By-By-Baby, Lullay! for mixed chorus a cappella (1965); anonymous words from the 15th century
- Ditty for treble voices (SA) with piano (1966); words from Songs of Travel by Robert Louis Stevenson
- Love's Secret for male chorus a cappella (1967); words by William Blake
- To the Evening Star for mixed chorus a cappella (1967); words by William Blake
- Christmas Perspectives for mixed voices a cappella (1980)
- Festival Mass for mixed chorus and organ (1980)
- Chaunticleer, Motet for male chorus a cappella (1984); words by Geoffrey Chaucer
- From the Canterbury Tales for mixed voices a cappella (1986); words by Geoffrey Chaucer in translation by Anne Worthington Prescott
- Chaucerian Visions for mixed voices and piano (1987); words by Geoffrey Chaucer in translation by Anne Worthington Prescott
- Wonders of Christmas for soloists and mixed chorus a cappella (1993)

1. How Great a Mystery; traditional words
2. So Gracious Is the Time; words by William Shakespeare
3. Green Grow'th the Holly ; anonymous words from the 16th century
4. The Star of Christmas Morning; traditional words
5. Nativity Morn; words by John Milton
6. The Stable; anonymous words

- Our Joyful Feast for mixed chorus a cappella (published 2002); words by George Wither
- The Christmas Tree for mixed chorus a cappella
- Long, Long Ago for mixed chorus a cappella
