= William H. Peck =

American writer (1830–1892)

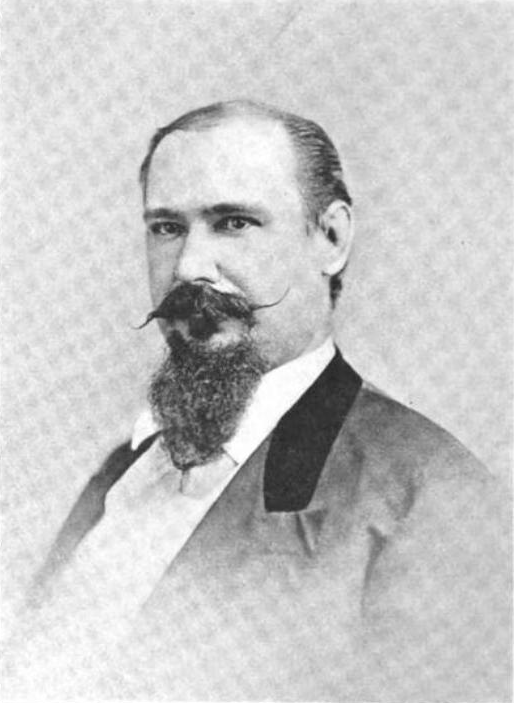
- Born: William Henry Peck; December 30, 1830; Augusta, Georgia
- Died: February 4, 1892 (aged 61); Jacksonville, Florida
- Resting place: Westview Cemetery
- Occupation: Writer
- Spouse: Monica Kenny Blake (m. 1854; died 1891)

William Henry Peck (December 30, 1830 – February 4, 1892) was a writer from the Southern United States.

== Biography ==
Peck was born in the Sand Hill section of Richmond County, Georgia, part of Augusta. He was the son of Samuel Hopkins Peck, a merchant in Augusta, and his wife, the former Sarah Holmes Pate. Samuel Peck, later known as Colonel Peck due to his experience in the Mexican–American War, was descended from the Paul Peck family, one of the early settlers of Hartford, Connecticut.

In 1842, Florida's Congress passed the Armed Occupation Act which encouraged citizens to move and settle the relatively untamed areas of central Florida. Peck moved with his father and brothers in 1843 to the Indian River Colony in St. Lucie County in east Florida. He later wrote descriptively about this area and his meeting with early pioneers such as lighthouse keeper Mills Burnham of Cape Canaveral in the Florida Star newspaper in 1887. In a piece for the New York Ledger, Peck also described the opening of the Indian River inlet with the picks and shovels that were available at that time. The family is accredited with building the first frame house in the area and Peck's Lake is given to be named for them.

Peck received an extensive education at a boarding school in Connecticut, a military school in Georgetown, Kentucky and attended Harvard where he received a degree in 1853 and masters in 1855. His writing career took off with submissions to Robert Bonner's New York Ledger where it was reported he was paid $5000 for stories for this publication. In 1873 The Augusta Chronicle reported:

"A DISTINGUISHED AUGUSTA AUTHOR" Our readers will be gratified to learn of the success in the literary world of our neighbor Professor William Henry Peck who is the author of some of the best and most popular romances of the day. The professor is a citizen of Harlem ... romance writer for the New York Ledger ... ATTRACTION EXTRAORDINARY ... it is with no little pride and gratification that we announce an exclusive engagement for a long term of years with that renowned and brilliant author William Henry Peck ... particularly so as the author is Georgian. Professor William Henry Peck is, we believe, a native of Augusta and doubtless is known to many of our citizens.

William Peck earlier served as professor of history at Tulane University of Louisiana and served as an educator for several institutions. In 1861, he moved to Atlanta, Georgia, where he started The Georgia Weekly and divided his time between Atlanta and New York until he retired to the home of his youth in Jacksonville, Florida. He married Monica Kenny Blake on October 20, 1854, and was the father of seven children. With his family, he later moved to Merritt Island, Florida, where he owned many acres of citrus groves and started a post office. He was postmaster at the Courtenay Post Office which had a steamer called Courtenay. Peck's activities were often written about in the Florida Star newspaper. He later moved from Courtenay to close by Cocoa, Florida. His daughter Byrnnia Peck married Edward Postell Porcher in Charleston, South Carolina, on December 15. Another daughter, Daisy Peck, wrote for the Cocoa Tribune.

Peck died soon after his wife in 1892 in Jacksonville and is buried at Westview Cemetery in Atlanta, Georgia.

== Bibliography ==
Peck published over seventy-five books, mostly novels. These books include:

- The M'Donalds; or, The ashes of southern homes. A tale of Sherman's march. This book was said to be loosely based on the experiences of his sister's family, the McDonalds from Augusta. (Written at the age of 37)
- The Confederate flag on the ocean. A tale of the cruises of the Sumter and Alabama
- The Stone-Cutter of Lisbon.
- Wild Redburn, an Indian Tale
- In May 1887, he wrote a story in the Florida Star about Gilbert's Bar. A very descriptive account of his teen years about the early pioneers of the Indian River area.
- Story in Florida Star dated July 17, 1889, records a social event at the home of W.H. Peck in Cocoa Florida. "Watching the Night Cereus bloom".
- Published The Fortune-teller of New Orleans.
- Published Siballa the sorceress; or, The Flower Girl of London.
- Published The Executioner of Venice, a novel.
