= Cape Canaveral Light =

Lighthouse in Florida, U.S.

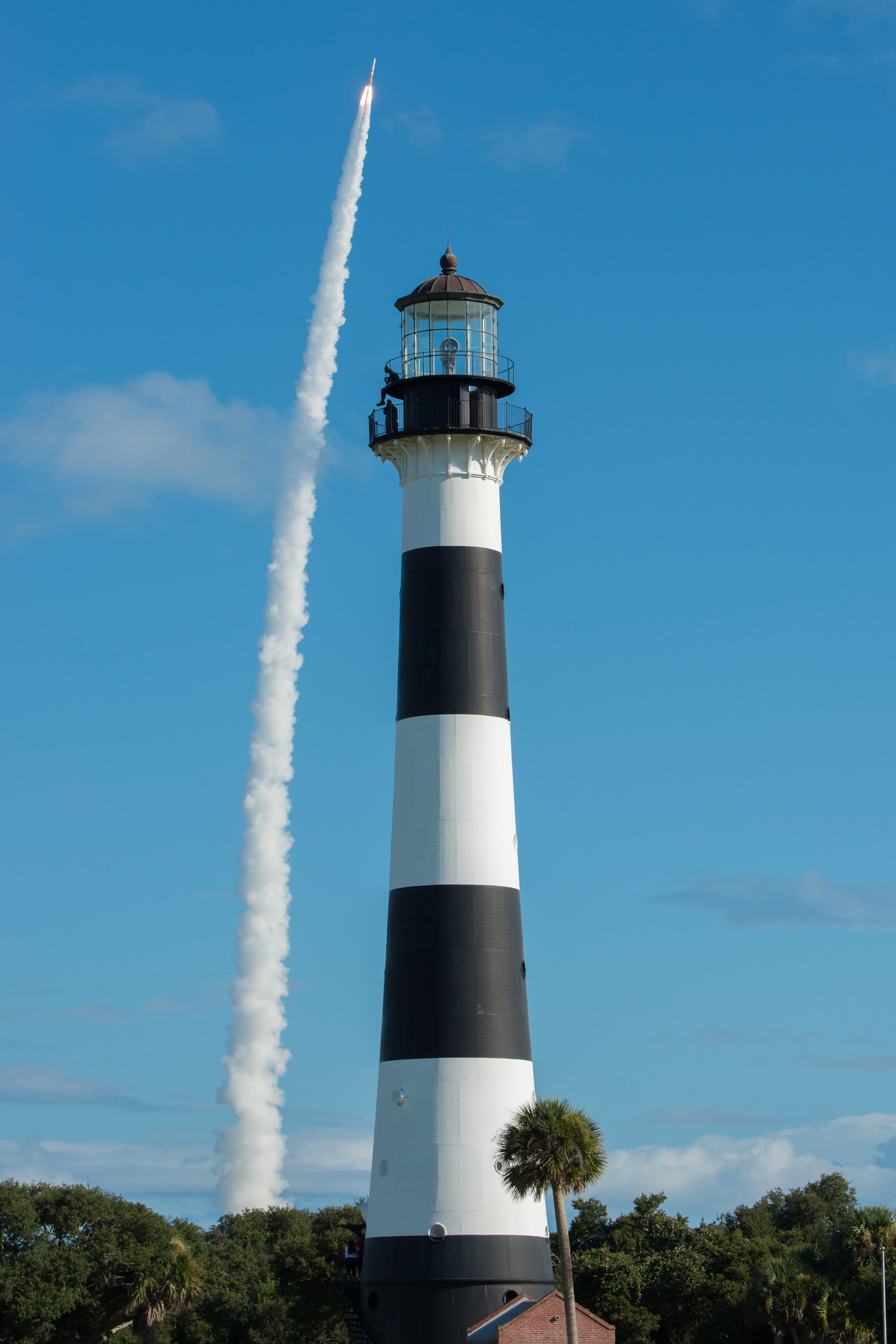
- The Cape Canaveral Lighthouse in 2019, during a Delta IV launch.
- Location: one mile inland from Cape Canaveral, Florida, United States
- Coordinates: 28°27′37″N 80°32′36″W

Tower
- Constructed: 1859
- Construction: brick (backing), cast iron (cladding), granite (foundation), rubble (foundation)
- Automated: 1954
- Height: 46 m (151 ft)
- Shape: truncated cone
- Markings: 1868: white 1873: black and white horizontal bands with white lantern room 1894: black and white horizontal bands with black lantern room
- Power source: lard, kerosene, electricity
- Operator: Space Launch Delta 45

Light
- First lit: 10 May 1868
- Focal height: 42 m (138 ft)
- Lens: first order Fresnel lens (1868–1993), DCB-224 (1993–)
- Range: 24 nmi (44 km; 28 mi)
- Characteristic: Fl(2) W 20s (1993–)
- Original light
- Constructed: January 1848
- Height: 65 ft (20 m)
- Markings: White
- First lit: 1 March 1849
- Deactivated: May 1868
- Focal height: 18.3 m (60 ft)
- Lens: parabolic reflector (1849–1861), fourth order Fresnel lens (1867–1868)
- Range: 12 nmi (22 km; 14 mi), 3.5 nmi (6.5 km; 4.0 mi)
- Characteristic: Fl W 195s, Fl W 60s, L Fl W 60s

The Cape Canaveral Light is a historic lighthouse on the east coast of the U.S. state of Florida. The light was established in 1848 to warn ships of the dangerous shoals that lie off its coast. It is located inside the Cape Canaveral Space Force Station and managed by the Space Launch Delta 45 of the U.S. Space Force with the assistance of the Cape Canaveral Lighthouse Foundation. It is the only fully operational lighthouse owned by the United States Space Force. The United States Coast Guard currently maintain the light as an active navigation aid.

The current 151-foot (46 m) lighthouse tower was first erected and lit in 1868 then relocated further inland between 1893 and 1894. It was originally equipped with a first-order Fresnel lens that was automated in 1967 and then retired from the tower in 1993.

== History ==
The Cape Canaveral lighthouse was erected to warn mariners of the outlying shoals off its coast. Broken ground and shoals extend 13 nautical miles (24 km; 15 mi) northward and northeastward of the lighthouse terminating in the Hetzel and Ohio shoals, which have a depth of 11 ft (3.4 m) and 19 ft (5.8 m) respectively. Hetzel Shoal is located about 13.5 nautical miles (25.0 km; 15.5 mi) NE of the lighthouse and Ohio Shoals about 2.3 nautical miles (4.3 km; 2.6 mi) southward of Hetzel. In a heavy sea these shoals are marked by breakers, but with smooth sea there is nothing to indicate their locality. The land is usually not visible from off these outer shoals. Located closer to the land are the Chester, Bull and Southeast shoals, which are about 4.5 to 7.5 nautical miles (8.3 to 13.9 km; 5.2 to 8.6 mi) off the coast of the cape.

=== First lighthouse ===
The current Cape Canaveral Light is not the first lighthouse constructed on Cape Canaveral. On May 21, 1838, the building of the first lighthouse at the cape was requested by Florida territorial delegate Charles Downing. Nathaniel Scobie was appointed as the first lighthouse keeper and oversaw the construction of the lighthouse. The 65-foot (20 m) tall white conical brick tower and keeper's dwelling were completed in January 1848 at the cost of $13,300. Its light consisted of 15 Lewis lamps powered by whale oil, each with a 21-inch (530 mm) reflector. The lamps were set on a chandelier rotated via clockwork.

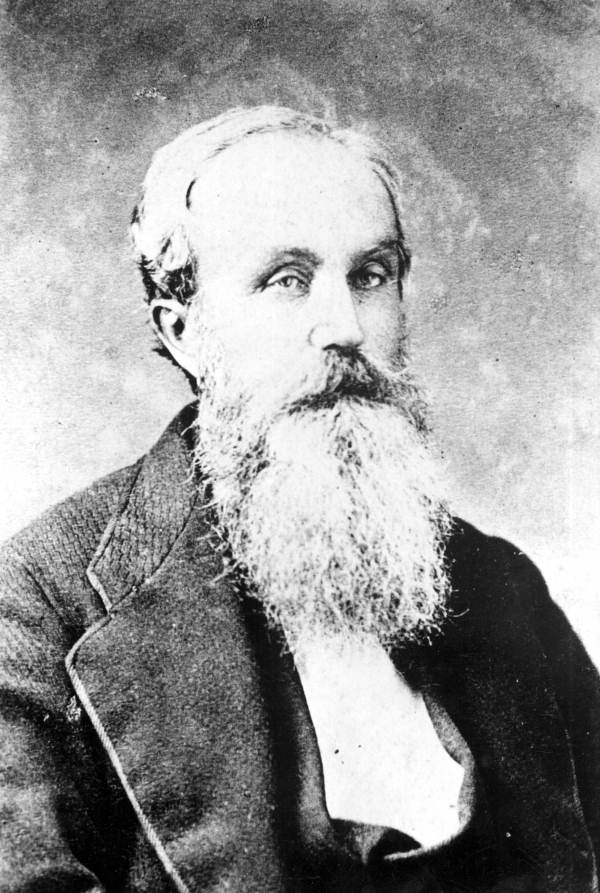
Mills Olcott Burnham, the second lighthouse keeper of the Cape Canaveral Light

During the Seminole War scare, Scobie abandoned the lighthouse, and refused to return to his post. Captain Mills Olcott Burnham (b. September 8, 1817) was appointed as the next lighthouse keeper in July 1853. Along with his position, Burnham was given 160 acres (65 ha) of land as part of the Florida Armed Occupation Act of 1842, a legislation passed to populate the state.

Sailors heavily criticized the white brick lighthouse with complaints that the light was too weak and too low to be seen before ships were on the reefs near the cape.

=== Second lighthouse ===
In 1860, the government approved the construction of a new lighthouse. However, the start of the American Civil War stopped the work on the new tower. The lamps and mechanism of the lighthouse were removed from the tower by Burnham and buried in his orange grove to protect them from Federal raids.

At the end of the war, construction resumed on the lighthouse. The chosen replacement tower was made with cast iron plate designed so that it can be disassembled and moved to a new location at a minimal cost, in case the encroaching sea started threatening the lighthouse. The conical tower was lined inside by bricks for stability and insulation. It was situated about 80 to 90 feet (24 to 27 m) from the location of the first tower. The new all-white lighthouse tower was completed in 1868, receiving a first-order Fresnel lens made by Henry-Lepaute and Company of Paris, France that was first lit on May 10, 1868.

The lower three levels of the tower served as the living quarters for the keepers and his assistants complete with kitchen, living room and bedrooms. The tower was designed to withstand flooding from storm surges that accompany strong hurricanes by making the entrance to the tower on the third floor, accessible by an outdoor stairway (the ground level door was later added in the 1930s). This was tested in 1871 when a strong storm submerged the station. The lighthouse and its keepers survived but the lamp oil and their drinking water were spoiled by the flood.

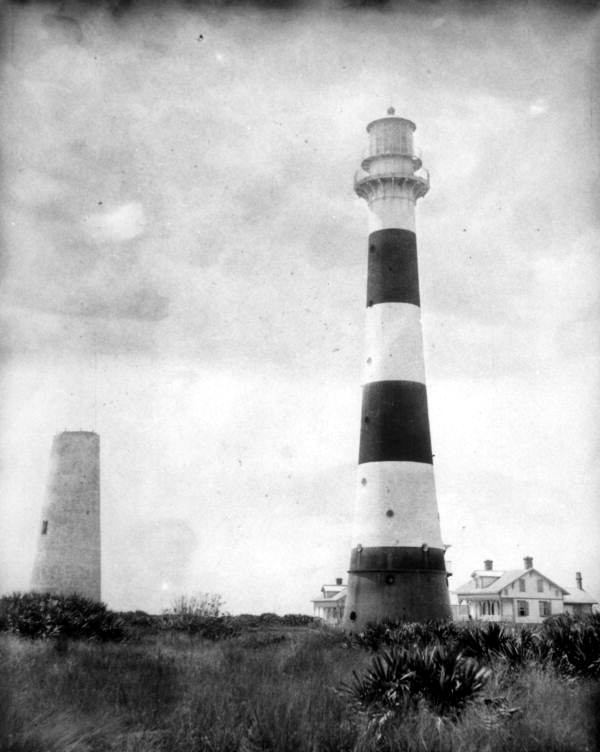
The old 1848 brick tower next to the 1868 iron tower with a white lantern room, before the latter was moved in 1893

The white lighthouse tower was changed to its signature three black bands and three white bands in 1873, with the lantern room remaining white.

Soon after, the iron tower became unbearable to the keepers under the Florida sun and humidity. They built and stayed in makeshift dwellings on the grounds of the lighthouse rather than stay in the oven-like tower. In 1876, funds in the amount of $12,000 were appropriated to construct permanent dwellings for the keepers.

=== Relocating the lighthouse ===
By the 1880s, shoreline erosion was feared to be threatening the lighthouse, and the United States Congress appropriated funds to move the lighthouse inland. Initial work to move the tower was started in October 1893. A temporary 55-foot (17 m) square black skeletal pyramidal lighthouse was erected to keep that section of the sea lit during the move. The tower had a 4th-order lamp with a focal height of 57 feet (17 m) and a visibility of 13 nautical miles (24 km; 15 mi).

The old tower (1848), which stood next to the new tower for about two decades, was blown up and the rubble was used to prepare a foundation for the lighthouse at the new location. The cast iron tower was dismantled, moved by a tram pulled by mules, and reassembled at the new location about a mile westward together with the keepers' houses. The move took nine months, and the lighthouse was relit at its new location on July 25, 1894. The 1900 Atlantic List of Lights indicated the color of the lantern room, which was probably painted during the move, as black.

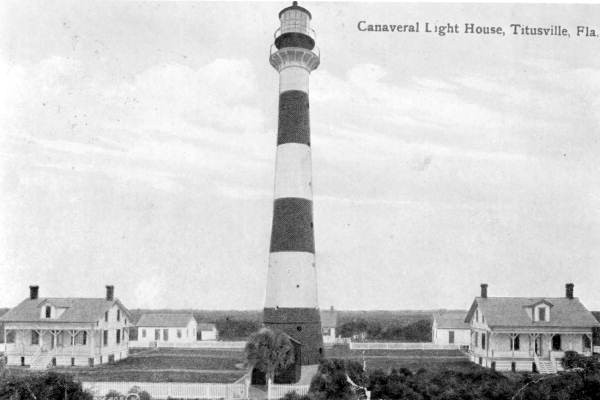
The station in 1910 with all the keepers' quarters and the tower with black lantern room

William H. Peck wrote about his meeting with lighthouse keeper Mills Burnham of Cape Canaveral in the Florida Star newspaper in 1887.

In 1931, the mechanical clockwork of the tower that was turned by descending weights and needed winding every hour or two was modernized and replaced by an electric motor.

=== Transition into a military facility ===
President Harry S. Truman signed the legislation titled Public Law 60 on May 11, 1949, that established Cape Canaveral as the Joint Long Range Proving Ground, a site for missile testing by the military. By this time, several small communities had developed in Cape Canaveral, two of which lie near the lighthouse: De Soto Beach to its north, which was located in the vicinity of Launch Complex 36 and Stinkmore to the south, located near Launch Complexes 17 and 5. When rockets began launching from the Cape in the early 1950s, all its residents, except the lighthouse keepers, were relocated to other areas. In 1960, the need for a keeper to live nearby was eliminated with the automation of the light. The keeper's homes were later demolished leaving only the brick oil house in the vicinity of the lighthouse.

After it was discovered that strong vibrations that accompany launches were loosening the prisms of the first-order Fresnel lens, it was finally removed in 1993 and sent to the lighthouse museum of the Ponce de Leon Inlet Light for restoration and display. The light was replaced by a DCB-224, a high-power searchlight that increased its range to 24 nautical miles (44 km; 28 mi).

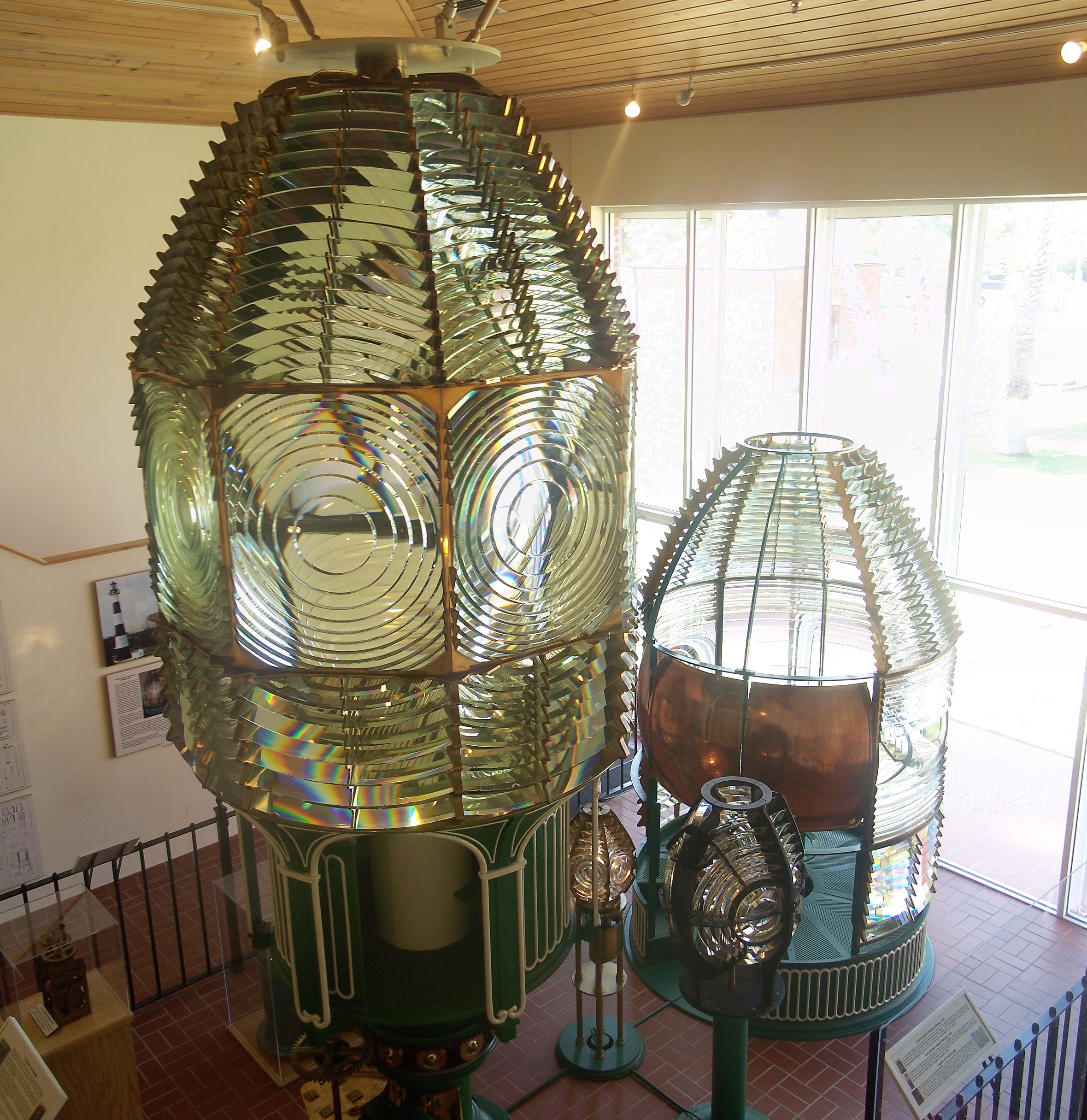
The 16.5-foot (5.0 m) tall original 1st-order Fresnel lens of the Cape Canaveral lighthouse (left) on display at the Ponce de Leon Inlet Lighthouse Museum with the 1st-order Fresnel lens of the Ponce de Leon Inlet Light (right).

Ownership of the lighthouse was transferred by the United States Coast Guard to the United States Air Force on December 14, 2000. In 2002, the Cape Canaveral Lighthouse Foundation was formed and a memorandum of agreement was signed with the Air Force.

== Head lighthouse keepers ==
The following is the list of head lighthouse keepers that served the station:

- Nathaniel C. Scobie 1848 – 1850
- Ora Carpenter 1850 – 1853
- Mills O. Burnham 1853 – 1886
- George M. Quarterman 1886 – 1887
- James M. Knight 1887 – 1893
- John L. Stuck 1893 – 1904
- Clinton P. Honeywell 1904 – 1930
- Oscar F. Quarterman 1930 – 1939
- A. Davis 1939 – at least 1941

== Restoration ==
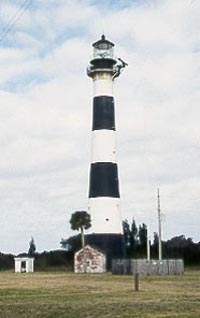
The Cape Canaveral Lighthouse in 1995 before restoration.

Since toxic lead paint was used to paint the lighthouse, a restoration project from 1995 to 1996 sandblasted the harmful paint off. The original copper lantern was also replaced with a galvanized steel lantern and was made into a lighthouse gazebo at the grounds of the Air Force Space and Missile Museum at Launch Complex 26 inside the Cape Canaveral Space Force Station. A plaque mounted on a podium made from bricks of the 1848 lighthouse, was built to commemorate its dedication in October 1997.

In 2003, the oil house located in front of the ground floor door was restored to its original (1890s) state. Strong winds had damaged the roof in the 1970s. A window that was added to the brick structure in the early 1900s was also covered up during restoration.

During the 2006-2007 project, the structure was repainted using modern materials. The original copper lantern was repaired and restored to the lighthouse. The displaced galvanized steel lantern took its place at the lighthouse gazebo leaving just the original copper vent ball on its top. Ground sample tests taken in 2008 showed a very high level of lead in the soil around the tower, and visitors were kept 50 yards (46 m) away from the lighthouse for some time.

== The lighthouse today ==
The lighthouse is open to public visitors and previously was a part of the Air Force Space and Missile Museum public tour. However, as of 2013 due to sequestration the Space Launch Delta 45 no longer offers a tour of the area. Currently, tours of the lighthouse, and nearby museum, are done through the Cape Canaveral Lighthouse Foundation. Visitors may only ascend to the fifth floor of the lighthouse as the remaining floors have been deemed as a safety liability by the Space Force and require special access to ascend.

The Cape Canaveral Lighthouse Foundation and volunteers are instrumental in the restoration projects and in interpreting the lighthouse history. Future plans of the foundation includes the restoration of the three keeper's cottages for multipurpose use.

== See also ==
- List of lighthouses in Florida
- List of lighthouses in the United States
