= Ponce Inlet, Florida =

Town in the state of Florida, United States

- Town
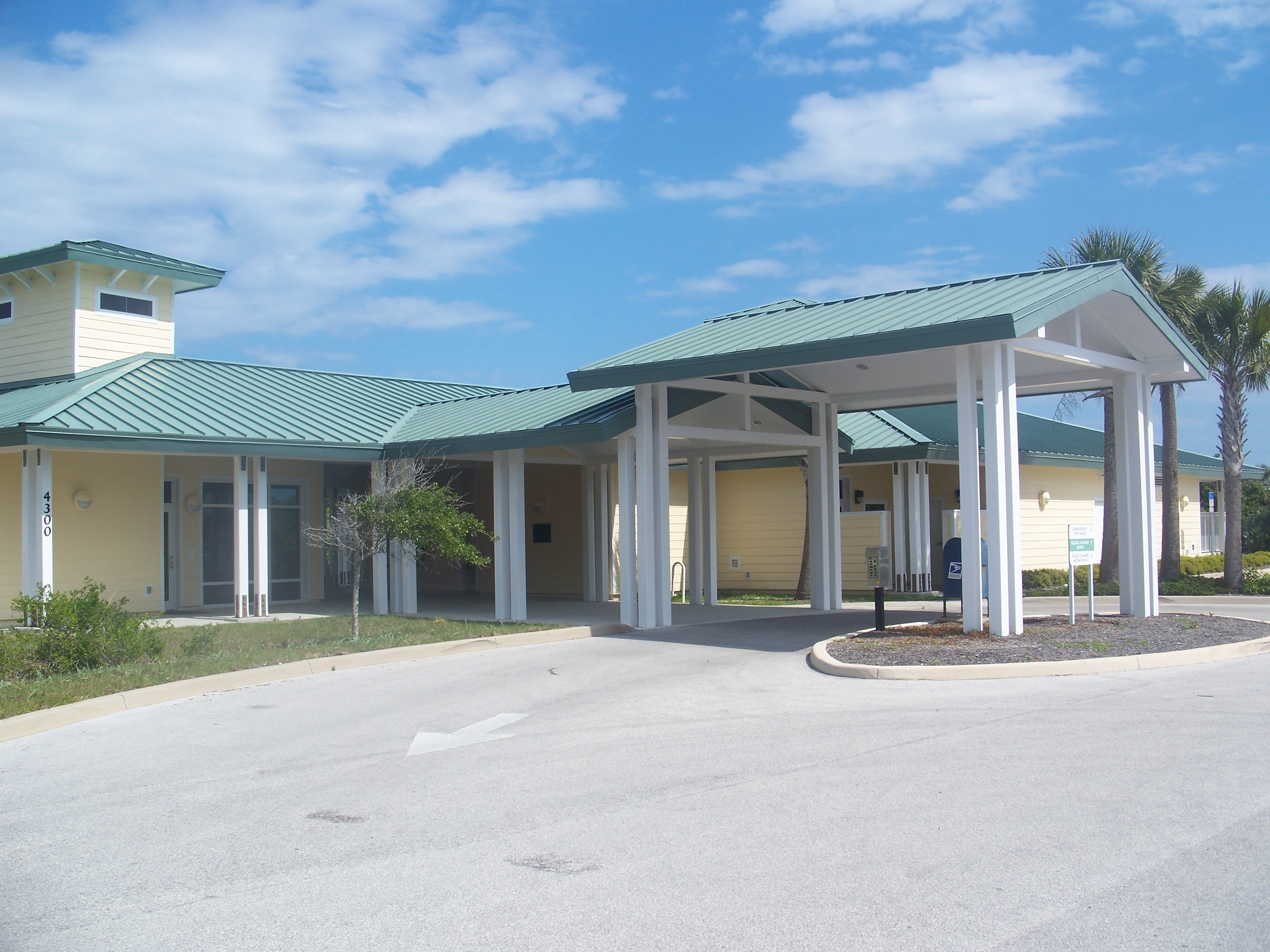
- Ponce Inlet Town Hall

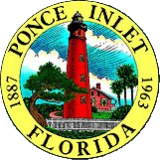
- Seal

- Location in Volusia County and the state of Florida
- Coordinates: 29°06′51″N 80°55′42″W
- Country: United States
- State: Florida
- County: Volusia
- Settled (Ponce Park): November 15, 1883–November 1, 1887
- Platted (Ponce Park): 1890
- Unincorporated area (Ponce Inlet): May 1963
- Incorporated (City of Ponce Inlet): August 20, 1963

Government
  - Type: Council-Manager
  - Mayor: Lois Paritsky
  - Vice Mayor: Gary L. Smith
  - Council Members: Bill Milano, Skip White, and Joe Villanella
  - Town Manager: Mike Disher
  - Town Clerk: Kim Cherbano

Area
  - Total: 14.75 sq mi (38.21 km^{2})
  - Land: 4.49 sq mi (11.62 km^{2})
  - Water: 10.27 sq mi (26.59 km^{2})
- Elevation: 0 ft (0 m)

Population (2020)
  - Total: 3,364
  - Density: 750.1/sq mi (289.62/km^{2})
- Time zone: UTC-5 (Eastern (EST))
  - Summer (DST): UTC-4 (EDT)
- ZIP code: 32127
- Area code: 386
- FIPS code: 2407147
- GNIS feature ID: 12-58200
- Website: ponce-inlet.org

Ponce Inlet is a town in Volusia County, Florida, United States. It is part of the Deltona–Daytona Beach–Ormond Beach, Florida Metropolitan Statistical Area, as well as the Halifax area. The population was 3,364 at the 2020 census.

The town of Ponce Inlet is located on the southern tip of a barrier island, south of Daytona Beach and Daytona Beach Shores.

Several marinas are located in Ponce Inlet. The community is known for its strict land use regulations.

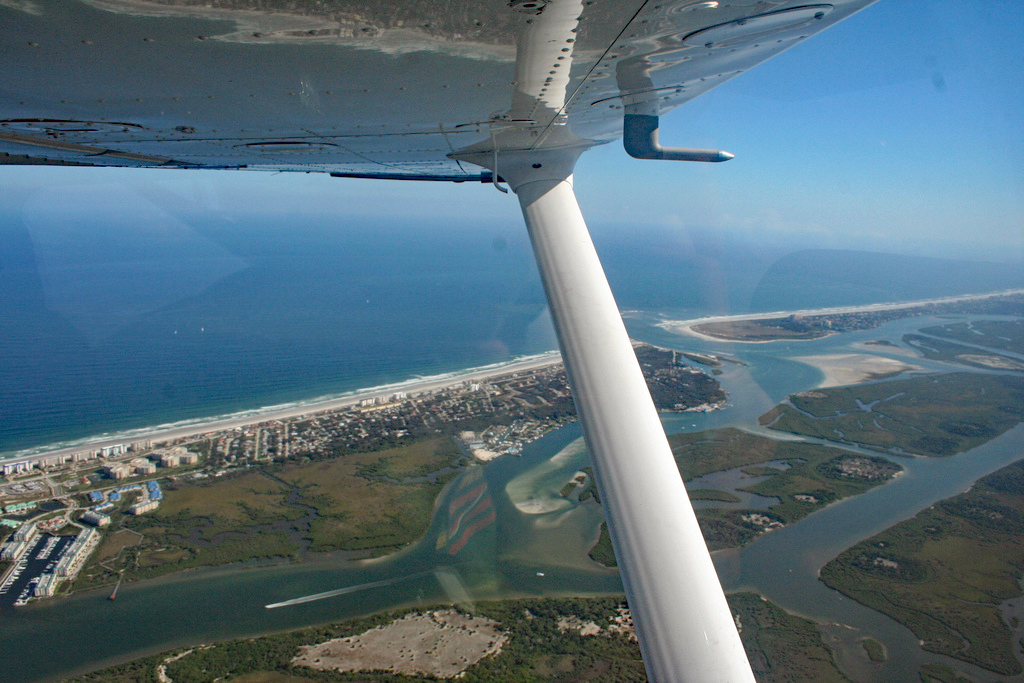
Aerial view of the Town of Ponce Inlet

== Geography ==
Ponce Inlet lies on a peninsula adjacent to the Ponce de León Inlet, and between the Halifax River and Atlantic Ocean.

According to the United States Census Bureau, the town has a total area of 14.7 square miles (38 km^{2}), of which 4.3 square miles (11 km^{2}) is land and 10.3 square miles (27 km^{2}) (70.48%) is water.

=== Climate ===
The Town of Ponce Inlet is part of the humid subtropical climate zone with a Köppen Climate Classification of "Cfa" (C = mild temperate, f = fully humid, and a = hot summer).

== Demographics ==
Historical population
Census	Pop.	Note	%±
1970	328		—
1980	1,003		205.8%
1990	1,704		69.9%
2000	2,513		47.5%
2010	3,032		20.7%
2020	3,364		10.9%
U.S. Decennial Census

=== Racial and ethnic composition ===
Ponce Inlet racial composition (Hispanics excluded from racial categories) (NH = Non-Hispanic)
Race	Pop 2010	Pop 2020	% 2010	% 2020
White (NH)	2,895	3,069	95.48%	91.23%
Black or African American (NH)	4	12	0.13%	0.36%
Native American or Alaska Native (NH)	7	1	0.23%	0.03%
Asian (NH)	30	44	0.99%	1.31%
Pacific Islander or Native Hawaiian (NH)	2	0	0.07%	0.00%
Some other race (NH)	4	8	0.13%	0.24%
Two or more races/Multiracial (NH)	34	89	1.12%	2.65%
Hispanic or Latino (any race)	56	141	1.85%	4.19%
Total	3,032	3,364		

=== 2020 census ===
As of the 2020 census, Ponce Inlet had a population of 3,364. The median age was 64.5 years. 7.0% of residents were under the age of 18 and 48.6% of residents were 65 years of age or older. For every 100 females there were 92.1 males, and for every 100 females age 18 and over there were 92.0 males age 18 and over.

100.0% of residents lived in urban areas, while 0.0% lived in rural areas.

There were 1,716 households in Ponce Inlet, of which 10.1% had children under the age of 18 living in them. Of all households, 60.0% were married-couple households, 13.4% were households with a male householder and no spouse or partner present, and 21.8% were households with a female householder and no spouse or partner present. About 27.9% of all households were made up of individuals and 19.0% had someone living alone who was 65 years of age or older.

There were 3,071 housing units, of which 44.1% were vacant. The homeowner vacancy rate was 2.4% and the rental vacancy rate was 17.6%.

In the Census Bureau's 2020 American Community Survey 5-year estimates, there were 1,063 families residing in the town.

=== 2010 census ===
As of the 2010 United States census, there were 3,032 people, 1,441 households, and 1,091 families residing in the town.

=== 2000 census ===
As of the census of 2000, there were 3,032 people, 1,206 households, and 883 families residing in the town. Census population estimate for 2006 was 3,192. The population density was 580.1 inhabitants per square mile (224.0/km^{2}). There were 2,043 housing units at an average density of 471.6 units per square mile (182.1 units/km^{2}). The racial makeup of the town was 97.73% White, 0.60% African American, 0.24% Native American, 0.72% Asian, 0.04% Pacific Islander, 0.16% from other races, and 0.52% from two or more races. Hispanic or Latino of any race were 1.55% of the population.

In 2000, there were 1,206 households out of which 11.9% had children under the age of 18 living with them, 65.9% were married couples living together, 5.1% had a female householder with no husband present, and 26.7% were non-families. 21.9% of all households were made up of individuals and 10.1% had someone living alone who was 65 years of age or older. The average household size was 2.08 and the average family size was 2.38.

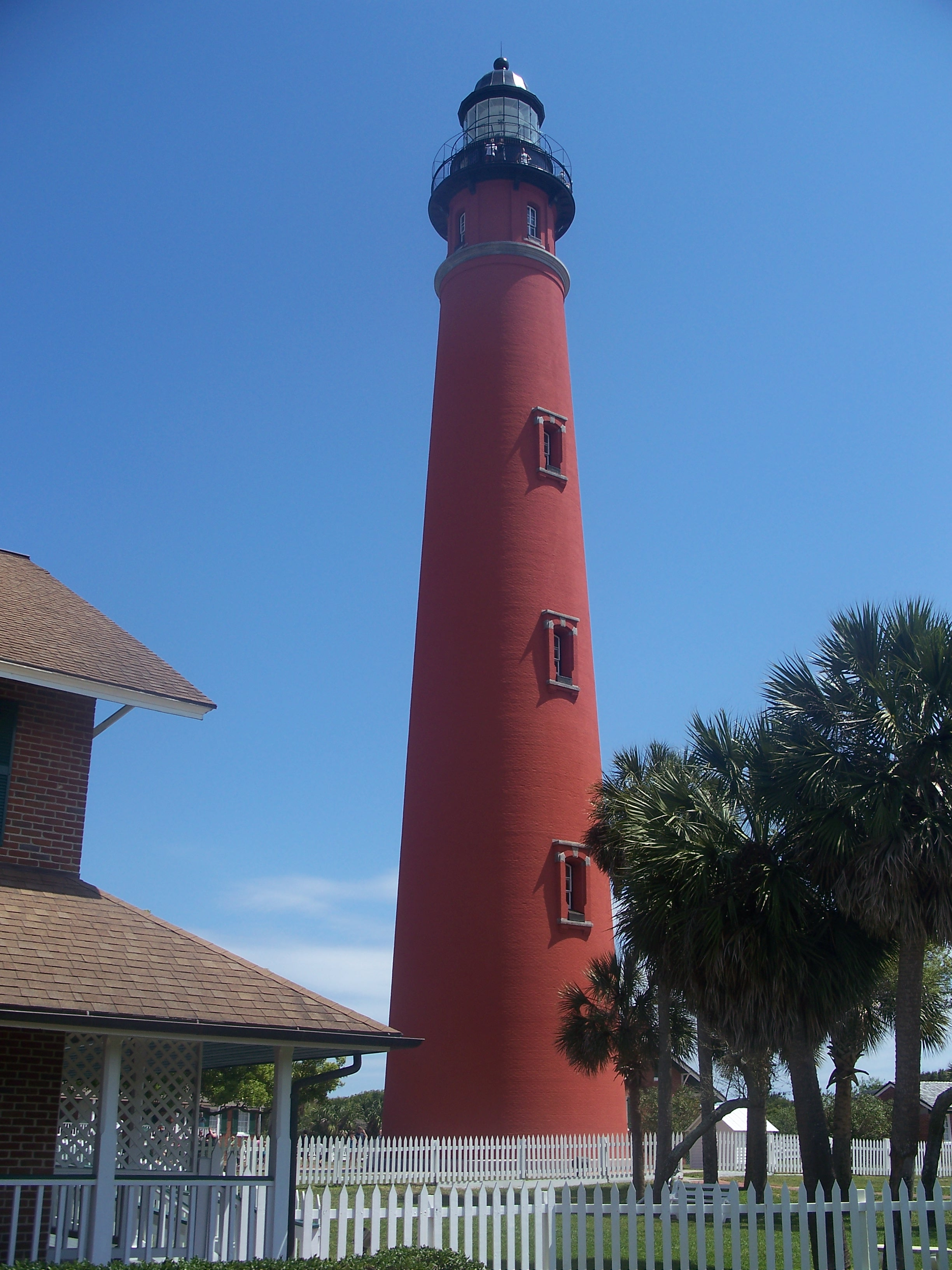
Ponce de León Inlet Light lighthouse

In 2000, in the town the population was spread out with 10.1% under the age of 18, 3.2% from 18 to 24, 15.6% from 25 to 44, 38.2% from 45 to 64, and 32.9% who were 65 years of age or older. The median age was 57 years. For every 100 females there were 95.0 males. For every 100 females age 18 and over, there were 93.3 males.

In 2000, the median income for a household in the town was $52,112, and the median income for a family was $58,828. Males had a median income of $42,188 versus $31,989 for females. The per capita income for the town was $36,518. About 3.7% of families and 5.1% of the population were below the poverty line, including 8.8% of those under age 18 and 3.1% of those age 65 or over.

== Arts and culture ==
- Ponce de Leon Inlet Light, a lighthouse completed in 1887.
- Marine Science Center, a marine science and natural history museum completed in 2002.

== Government ==
Ponce Inlet is organized with a council-manager form of government; voters elect a Town Council, which consists of five members who serve two-year staggered terms. All five seats including the Mayor are town-wide; there are no districted seats. The Town Council establishes ordinances and policies for the town. It also reviews and approves the town budget annually. The Council appoints a Town Manager, who implements policy as voted on by the council. The town manager is the senior administrative official of the town, and is responsible for all aspects of administrative oversight.
