= Mills O. Burnham =

American politician

Mills Olcott Burnham
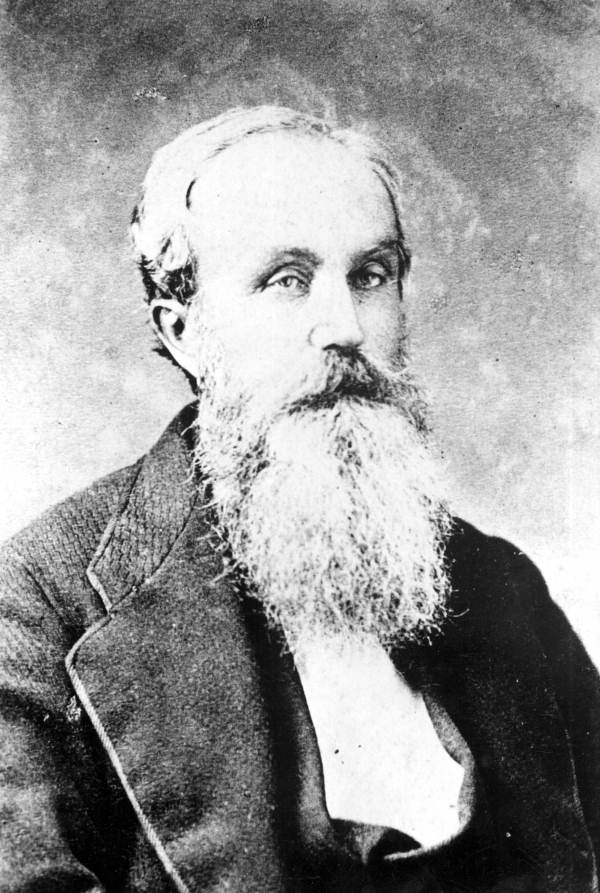

Member of the Florida House of Representatives from St. Lucia County
- In office 1847–1851

Personal details
- Born: September 8, 1817 Thetford, Vermont, US
- Died: April 17, 1886 (aged 68) Cape Canaveral, Florida, US
- Resting place: Burnham family cemetery on Cape Canaveral
- Spouse: Mary McCuen (m. 1835)
- Children: 2 boys, Mills Jr., Thadeus; five girls Frances, Anne, Mary, Lucy
- Education: Watervliet Government Arsenal

Mills Olcott Burnham (September 8, 1817 – April 17, 1886) was a Florida settler and member of the Florida House of Representatives from St. Lucia County.

== Early life ==
Mills Olcott Burnham was born September 8, 1817, in Thetford, Vermont, the son of Timothy Burnham, and Catherine Young. He was raised in Troy, New York, and served an apprenticeship in the Watervliet Government Arsenal, learning gunsmithing.

== Florida settler at Susanna ==
He moved to Florida for health reasons in 1837, and brought his wife and two children in August 1839. They originally settled in Garey's Ferry, near Jacksonville.

With the Armed Occupation Act, he filed a claim to settle in the area now known as Ankona, just south of present-day Fort Pierce, which was then called Susanna. He introduced pineapple cultivation, which would later prove to be a significant crop for the area.

He was the first sheriff of what was then St. Lucia County in 1847.

In order to supplement his income, he purchased a schooner, which he named "The Josephine" which he used to become a commercial fisherman. He harvested green sea turtles, and sold them in Charleston. He took good care of his cargo during shipping, and developed a reputation for quality goods. Burnham also raised sheep.

== Political career ==
Burnham was a member of the Florida House of Representatives from 1847 to 1851.

== Florida settler at Canaveral ==
After hostilities with natives, in August 1849, the Burnham's and most of the other settlers left the colony and fled to safety in St. Augustine. He and his family which now included three more daughters, moved to Canaveral, in 1853. He was the keeper of the Cape Canaveral Light for 30 years beginning in 1853.

Mills died on April 17, 1886, at age 68.

== See also ==
- Ossian B. Hart
- William F. Russell
