= Ponce de Leon Inlet =

Ocean inlet in Florida, US

Coordinates: 29°04′21″N 80°55′07″W

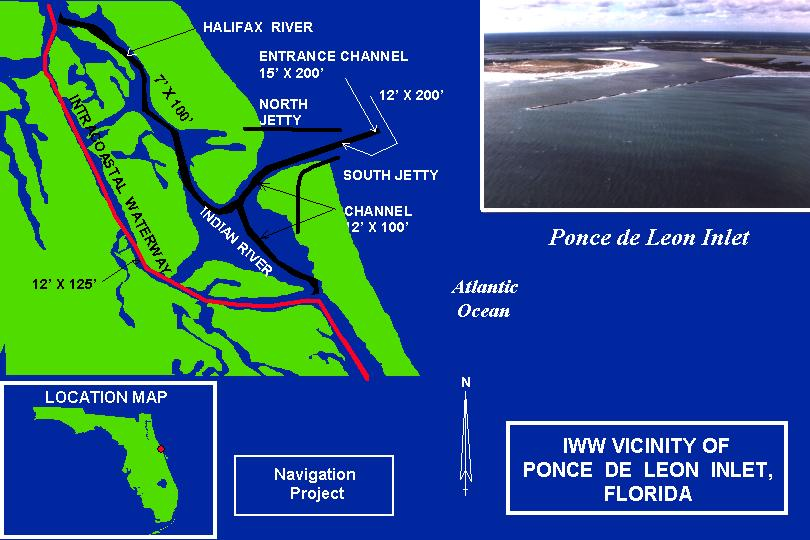
Location and details of the Ponce de Leon Inlet.

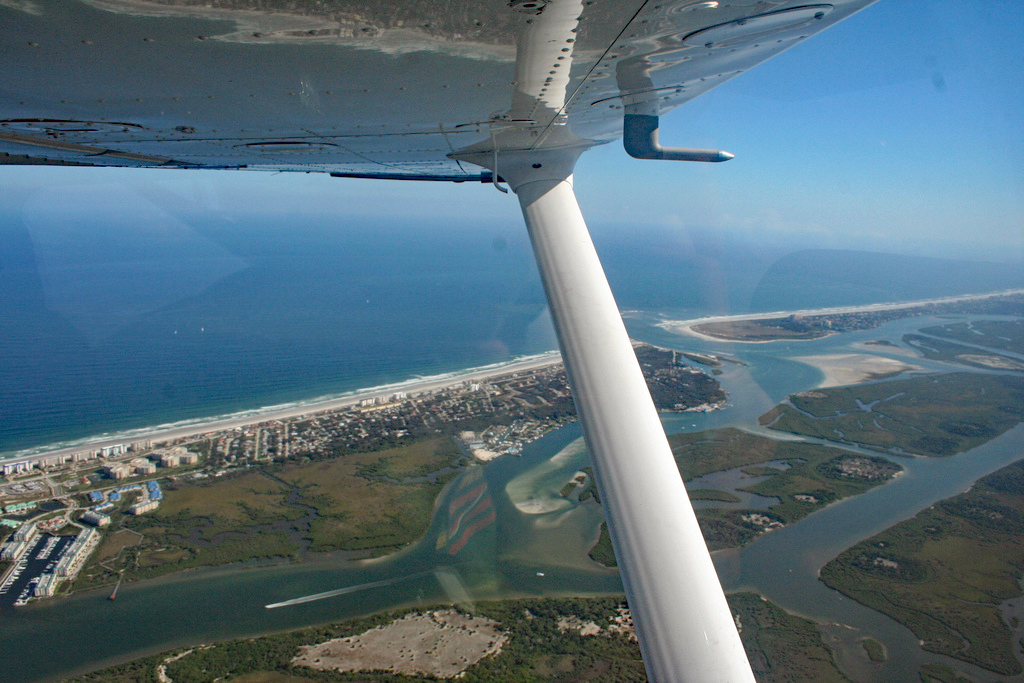
Aerial view

The Ponce de Leon Inlet is a natural opening in the barrier islands in central Florida that connects the north end of the Mosquito Lagoon and the south end of the Halifax River to the Atlantic Ocean. The inlet originally was named Mosquito Inlet. In 1926 the Florida Legislature changed the name from Mosquito Inlet to Ponce de Leon Inlet. There was precedent for the change. Mosquito County had long before become Orange County, and the Mosquito River had become the Halifax River. Only the Mosquito Lagoon has kept its old name. It is the site of the town of Ponce Inlet, Florida and the Ponce de Leon Inlet Light. The inlet is maintained by the Ponce de Leon Inlet & Port District, a division of the Volusia County, Florida government.
