= Crane (surname) =

Crane is a surname. The name is a derivative of "Cron" in Old English or is the English translation of the German "Krahn" or "Kranich." According to The Oxford Dictionary of Family Names in Britain & Ireland, "Cron," "Krahn" and "Kranich" all mean "crown" in both Old English and German respectively. According to the same source, "Crone" is also compared with "Crane", "Crown", "Cron" and "Crowne". In some places in Britain, "Crane", when used as a name, can also be a reference to a tall, slender man, similar to the bird, "Crane" or to someone with long legs. Both the modern English version of "Crane" and modern German versions of "Krahn" or "Kranich" are more commonly associated with the tall bird than with a crown and the Old English and Old German translations have become less common.

Notable people with the surname include:

- Albert Victor Crane (1923–2003), Western Australian politician
- Andy Crane (born 1964), English radio and television presenter
- Arthur G. Crane (1877–1955), American teacher and politician
- Barry Crane (1927–1985), American television producer and director and bridge player
- Ben Crane (born 1976), American professional golfer
- Bill Crane (1924–2014), Australian rules footballer
- Bob Crane (1928–1978), American DJ and actor, played Hogan in the sitcom Hogan's Heroes
- Bob Crane (cricketer) (1942–2013), Australian cricketer
- Brian Crane, American cartoonist, creator of the Pickles comic strip
- Bruce Crane (1857–1937) American tonalist painter
- Callum Crane (born 1996), Scottish footballer
- Caprice Crane (born 1974), American screenwriter, author, and producer
- Charles Crane, mayor of Honolulu (1938–41)
- C. Howard Crane Charles Howard Crane (1885–1952), American architect
- Charles Richard Crane (1858–1939), American philanthropist
- Cheryl Crane (born 1943), daughter of actress Lana Turner
- Dan Crane (1936–2020), American dentist and member of the US House of Representatives
- David Crane (disambiguation), several people

- David Crane (historian) (fl. 1999–2013), British historian
- David Crane (lawyer) (born 1950), Chief Prosecutor for the U.N. War Crimes Tribunal for Sierra Leone
- David Crane (politics) (born 1953), political advisor to Arnold Schwarzenegger and lecturer at Stanford University
- David Crane (producer) (born 1957), co-creator of the sitcom Friends
- David Crane (programmer) (born 1953), video game designer, programmer and co-founder of Activision
- David W. Crane (born 1959), American lawyer, investment banker and business executive

- Doris Crane (1911–1999), British artist
- Ed Crane (disambiguation), several people

- Ed Crane (baseball) (1862–1896), American right-handed pitcher and outfielder in Major League Baseball
- Ed Crane (journalist), reporter for CBS News
- Ed Crane (politician) (1944–2026), founder of the Cato Institute

- Eva Crane (1912–2007), British researcher on bees and beekeeping
- Evan J. Crane, American chemist and editor of Chemical Abstracts
- Frank Crane (1861–1928), American clergyman and writer
- Frank Hall Crane (1873–1948), American actor and director
- Frederick E. Crane (1869–1947), Chief Judge of the NY Court of Appeals
- George W. Crane (1901–1995), psychologist, physician, and newspaper columnist
- Hart Crane (1899–1932), American poet
- Harry Crane (1914–1999), American comedy writer
- Hewitt Crane (1927–2008), pioneer computer scientist
- Horace Richard Crane (1907–2007), American physicist
- Irene Crane (active 1910–1911), American silent film actress
- Israel Crane (1774–1858), American businessman
- James Crane (disambiguation), several people

- James Crane (actor) (1889–1968), American stage and screen actor
- James Crane (police officer) (1921–1994), British police officer
- James L. Crane, American football coach

- Jim Crane (born 1954), American businessman and baseball team owner
- John Crane (disambiguation), several people

- John Crane (American politician), in Indiana
- John Crane (Australian politician) (1868–1948), of New South Wales Legislative Assembly
- John Crane (Canadian politician) (born 1935), Canadian politician
- John Crane (comptroller), English soldier based at Berwick-upon-Tweed
- John Crane (government official), U.S. Inspector General who supports whistleblowers
- John Crane (soldier) (1744–1805), in Boston Tea Party and American Revolutionary War
- John Crane (writer) (born 1962), writer and television producer

- Jonathan Crane (politician) (1750–1820), politician in Nova Scotia
- Jonathan Townley Crane (1819–1880), American clergyman, author and abolitionist
- Jordan Crane (comics) (born 1973), American comics creator
- Jordan Crane (rugby union) (born 1986), English rugby union player
- Joseph Halsey Crane (1782–1851), American soldier and attorney
- Laurence Crane (born 1961), English composer
- Leroy Bowers Crane (1849–1916), American politician and magistrate from New York
- Les Crane (1933–2008), American announcer and talk show host
- Louis Crane, quantum gravity theorist
- Lucy Crane (1842–1882), English writer, art critic and translator
- Mary Crane (disambiguation), several people

- Mary Crane, of the Conservative Party of Canada candidates, 2008 Canadian federal election#Malpeque
- Mary Helen Peck Crane (1827–1891), activist, writer; mother of Stephen Crane

- Mason Crane (born 1997), English cricketer
- Nicholas Crane (born 1954), British cartographer, explorer and broadcaster
- Nicky Crane (1959–1993), British neo-Nazi activist
- Olive Crane Mary Olive Crane (born 1957), Canadian politician and social worker
- Olive Kathleen Crane (1895–1935), Australian artist
- Oliver Crane (born 1998), American trans-Atlantic rower
- Oliver Crane (clergy) (1822–1896), American clergyman, scholar, writer
- Paul Crane (1944–2020), American football player
- Peter Crane (born 1954), director of the Royal Botanic Gardens, Kew, London
- Phil Crane (1930–2014), Republican member of the US House of Representatives
- Richard Crane (disambiguation), several people

- Richard Crane (actor) (1918–1969), American character actor
- Richard T. Crane (1832–1912), Chicago industrialist
- Richard Teller Crane II (1882–1938), United States diplomat
- H. Richard Crane (1907–2007), American physicist
- Sir Richard Crane, 1st Baronet (died 1645), of the Crane baronets

- Robbie Crane (born 1969), American rock bassist
- Robert Crane (disambiguation), several people:

- Robert Crane, pseudonym of Bernard Glemser
- Sir Robert Crane, 1st Baronet (1586–1643), English MP
- Robert Bruce Crane (1857–1937), American painter
- Robert C. Crane (1920–1962), American newspaper publisher and politician from New Jersey
- Robert Dickson Crane (born 1929), advisor to Nixon and American short story author
- Robert K. Crane (1919–2010), American biochemist, discovered sodium-glucose cotransport
- Robert Q. Crane (1926–2018), Treasurer and Receiver-General of Massachusetts

- Ronald Crane (1886–1967), American literary critic and historian
- Roy Crane (1901–1977), American cartoonist
- Sarah Crane (born 1972), Australian opera soprano
- Sibylla Bailey Crane (1851–1902), American educator, composer, author
- Simon Crane (born 1960), British stuntman
- Stanley Crane Leo Stanley Crane (1915–2003), American railroad executive
- Stephen Crane (1871–1900), American author
- Stephen Crane (delegate) (1709–1780), American politician
- Susanne Crane (born 1966), American artist
- Theodus Crane (born 1979), American actor and martial artist
- Thomas Crane (disambiguation), several people
- Vincent Crane (1943–1989), founder of rock group Atomic Rooster
- Walter Crane (1845–1915), English artist, part of the Arts and Crafts movement
- Whitfield Crane (born 1968), American musician
- William Crane (disambiguation), several people

- William Crane (musician) (died 1545), British musician
- William Crane (politician) (1785–1853), merchant, judge and legislator in New Brunswick
- William Carey Crane, president of Baylor University
- William M. Crane (1776–1846), officer in the United States Navy
- William H. Crane (1845–1928), American actor
- William Howe Crane (1854–1926), American lawyer

- Winthrop M. Crane (1853–1920), governor of Massachusetts and US senator

== Fictional characters ==
- Crane family (Passions) from the TV soap opera Passions
  - Alistair Crane
  - Ethan Crane
  - Fancy Crane
  - Fox Crane
  - Julian Crane
- Characters in the American sitcom Frasier
  - Frasier Crane, also in Cheers
  - Martin Crane, father of Frasier and Niles
  - Niles Crane, younger brother of Frasier
  - David Crane, son of Niles
- David Crane (comic strip), created by Win Mortimer
- Denny Crane, a lawyer on the TV series Boston Legal
- Ed Crane, lead character of The Man Who Wasn't There (2001 film)
- Harry Crane, Mad Men character
- Ichabod Crane, the main protagonist in the short story The Legend of Sleepy Hollow
- Jonathan Crane or Scarecrow (DC Comics), comic book villain in the Batman series
- Kyle Crane, the player character in the video game Dying Light
- Lee Crane, Captain of the Seaview on the 60's TV series "Voyage to the Bottom of the Sea"
- Marion Crane, character in Psycho (1960 film)
- Mary Crane, character in the Psycho (novel)
- Mary Crane, character in The Voyage (short story)
- Master Crane, character from the animated movie Kung-Fu Panda
- Rebecca Crane, fictional character in the Assassin's Creed franchise's modern storyline
- Robotman (Robert Crane), the first Robotman in the DC Universe
- Seneca Crane, a character in the novel The Hunger Games

== See also ==
- Crane (disambiguation)
- Krane (disambiguation)
- Castle Hill (Ipswich, Massachusetts), an estate owned by Richard Teller Crane Jr.
