= William Crane =

William Crane may refer to:

- William Crane (politician) (1785–1853), merchant, judge and legislator in New Brunswick
- William Carey Crane, president of Baylor University
- William M. Crane (1776–1846), officer in the United States Navy
- William H. Crane (1845–1928), American actor
- William Howe Crane (1854–1926), American lawyer
- William Crane (musician) (?-1545), British musician

== See also ==
- William Crain (disambiguation)
- Bill Crane (1924–2014), Australian rules footballer
