= Mary Crane =

Mary Crane may refer to:

- Mary Crane, one of the Conservative Party of Canada candidates, 2008 Canadian federal election#Malpeque
- Mary Crane Hone (1904–1990), American stage actress, campaign manager, political anti-war activist, and historical preservationist
- Mary Helen Peck Crane (1827–1891), activist, writer; mother of Stephen Crane

In fiction

- Mary Crane, a character in the novel Psycho
- Mary Crane, character in The Voyage

== See also ==
- Crane (surname)
