= Frank Crane =

Frank Crane may refer to:

- Frank Crane (clergyman and writer)
- Frank Crane (labor official), American civil servant, North Carolina Commissioner of Labor
- Frank Crane (politician), South Dakota politician
- Frank Hall Crane, American actor and director
