= David Crane =

David Crane may refer to:

== People ==
- David Crane (historian) (fl. 1999–2013), British historian
- David Crane (lawyer) (born 1950), former Chief Prosecutor for the U.N. War Crimes Tribunal for Sierra Leone, distinct from lawyer David W. Crane
- David Crane (politics) (born 1953), political advisor to Arnold Schwarzenegger and lecturer at Stanford University
- David Crane (producer) (born 1957), co-creator of the popular sitcom Friends
- David Crane (programmer) (born 1953), video game designer, programmer and co-founder of Activision
- David W. Crane (born 1959), American lawyer, investment banker and business executive, distinct from lawyer David Crane
- David Crane (Frasier), the son of Niles Crane and Daphne Moon in the sitcom Frasier

== Other uses ==
- David Crane (comic strip), created by Win Mortimer

== See also ==
- Crane (surname)
