= Controversies surrounding Robert Falcon Scott =

Historical controversy about British Antarctic explorer

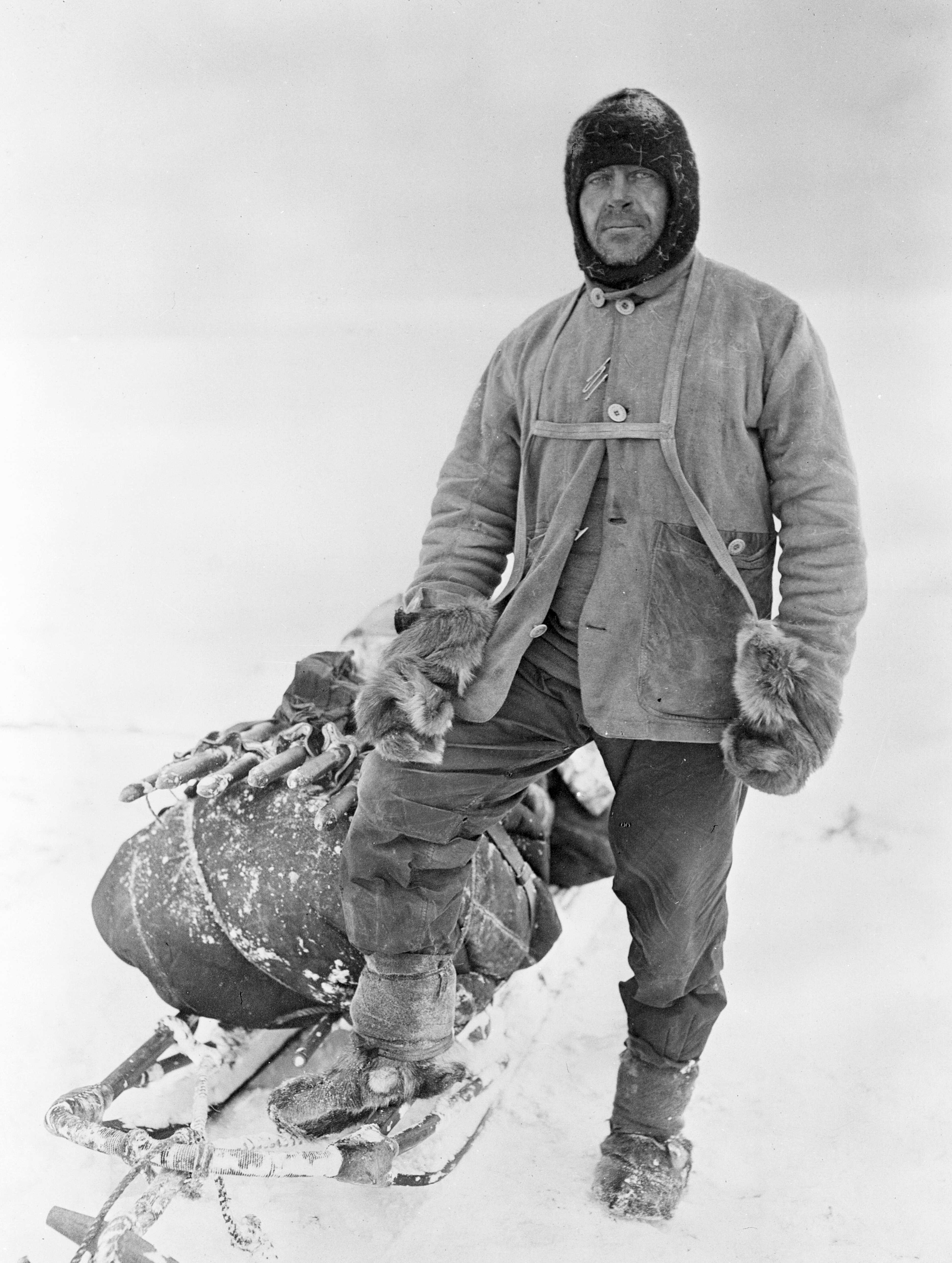
Robert Falcon Scott

The British Antarctic explorer Robert Falcon Scott became the subject of controversy when, more than 60 years after his death on the return march from the South Pole in 1912, his character came under sustained attack.

Up to then Scott's image, in Britain and much of the world, had been that of heroic endeavour, the cornerstone of his reputation was his "Message to the Public" written just before his death. However, Roland Huntford's 1979 joint biography of Scott and his rival Roald Amundsen presented a contrasting view of Scott, not as hero but as bungler. The book was reissued in the 1980s as The Last Place on Earth, and was the subject of a 1985 television serial The Last Place on Earth.

Although Huntford's objectivity was questioned, the book and related television drama changed the public's perception, with the "bungler" tag quickly becoming the new orthodoxy. In the 1980s and 1990s Scott was depicted negatively in several books. As Scott's reputation declined, that of his contemporary Ernest Shackleton, long overshadowed by Scott, was in the ascendent. Shackleton's man-management skills were celebrated, particularly in the United States, as models for business leaders.

The first decade of the 21st century saw specific attempts to rescue Scott's reputation. Analysis of March 1912 meteorological data has been used to suggest Scott and his party might have been primarily the victims of unusually severe Antarctic weather, rather than incompetence. A 2003 Scott biography by polar explorer Sir Ranulph Fiennes included a defence of Scott, and was the first book to mount a serious attack on Huntford's thesis and credentials. Other biographical and historical works, television programmes and articles have continued to appear, representing different areas of the controversy's spectrum.

In 2012, Karen May at the Scott Polar Research Institute re-discovered the fact that Scott had left written orders at Cape Evans to secure Scott's speedy return from the pole using dogs. This order was ultimately not carried out.

== Background ==
Robert Falcon Scott and four companions reached the South Pole on 17 January 1912, to find that they had been forestalled by a Norwegian party led by Roald Amundsen, who had arrived at the Pole five weeks earlier. Scott's party perished during their return journey to base camp in McMurdo Sound, their bodies and records being recovered by a search party during the following season.

== Assessments ==
=== Early criticism ===
Apsley Cherry-Garrard's 1922 book The Worst Journey in the World mentions mistakes, and includes descriptions of Scott's character as "weak" and "peevish", but still praises his heroism and concludes that he was "the last of the great geographical explorers". In 1928, cleric John Gordon Hayes published Antarctica: A treatise on the Southern Continent, in which he concludes that Scott's reliance on man-hauling instead of dogs had contributed to a disaster that could otherwise have been prevented. According to Max Jones (2003), "serious questions were raised about Scott's leadership, [but] his heroism in the face of death remained unchallenged."

Subsequent books and films continued to reinforce Scott's heroic reputation, up to and beyond World War II. Reginald Pound (1966) and Elspeth Huxley (1977), who each had access to original material including Scott's sledging journals, both produced full-length biographies which identify personal weaknesses but endorse Scott's heroism. David Thomson, in his book Scott's Men (1977), opined: "Scott does not strike me as a great man—at least, not until near the end".

=== Huntford ===
Two years later Roland Huntford published Scott and Amundsen, claiming that his primary motive was the righting of an historic wrong—the elevation of Scott to heroic status despite his failures, and the neglect of the successful Amundsen. The book, a sustained attack on Scott, has been described as "devastating" and "at best one-sided, at worst as wholly malicious"; in general it was an "anti-historical" approach to the debate.

It did, however, become a best-seller on both sides of the Atlantic, having an immediate negative impact on public perceptions of Scott, described by Huntford as "one of the worst of polar explorers". The new orthodoxy was that Scott, far from being a hero, was a "heroic bungler". The ready acceptance of this view of Scott has been attributed to the unavoidable reality of Britain's national decline.

Among the main allegations levelled by Huntford against Scott are:

1. Failure to organise an effective transport strategy, and in particular the failure to regard prior advice about the vital importance of dogs on polar journeys
2. Faulty judgment of character and/or ability, as in his alleged "favouritism" and supposed emotional attachment to Edgar Evans, again against advice
3. Disruption of the logistics of the polar march by adding a fifth man—Bowers—to the party which made the final dash to the Pole
4. Giving inconsistent and contradictory orders about the use of dogs in the organisation of any attempt to relieve the polar party on its return journey, with the result that no effective relief attempt was made
5. Specific organisational failures including mismanagement of the depot-laying, resulting in the placement of One Ton Depot too far to the north; the insistence on collecting geological specimens when the returning polar party was fighting for its life; putting at risk key members of the polar team—Wilson and Bowers—in allowing them to participate in the hazardous Winter Journey shortly before the polar march
6. General faults of character: being aloof, self-absorbed, over-sentimental, inflexible and obtuse

== Counter-revision ==
In 1997, Diana Preston published A First-Rate Tragedy: Robert Falcon Scott and the Race to the South Pole, a documentation of Scott's expeditions. While she admits some of Scott's weaknesses such as his short temper and jumpy style of decision-making, she also gives mitigating aspects to every questionable event.

In the first decade of the 21st century, attempts to rescue Scott's reputation were led by polar explorer and adventurer Sir Ranulph Fiennes, with his 2003 biography Captain Scott. The book has been noted not only for its defence of Scott but for the stridency of its attacks on Huntford, which Fiennes claimed would have gone considerably further, had the laws of libel allowed. Fiennes, who has apparently studied how the great explorers of his own generation came to be sidelined, later described Scott as "a great historic hero whose name has been dragged through the dirt."

Susan Solomon's summary of meteorological data for the Ross Ice Shelf during February and March 1912 advances the theory that the death of Scott's party was due to the extreme weather conditions that prevailed at that time, rather than to organisational failure. This conclusion is generally supported by David Crane in his 2005 biography, although faults are acknowledged.

Manchester historian Max Jones argues that the fall in Scott's public standing arose primarily from Huntford's successful depiction of Scott as "an emblem for the amateurism and incompetence which ... had encumbered Britain through the twentieth century." He concludes, however, that "raising Scott as an emblem of decline reveals more about current concerns than about past history." Jones further notes the "rediscovery" of Ernest Shackleton during the 1990s and that "Scott has been sacrificed on the altar of Shackleton worship", themes which are the main substance of Stephanie Barczewski's 2008 book Antarctic Destinies. Barczewski also advances the view that late 20th century cultural shifts would inevitably have caused reassessment of the traditional forms of heroism represented by Scott.

In 2012, Karen May at the Scott Polar Research Institute re-discovered the following facts. In 1921, Edward Evans revealed in his book South with Scott that Scott had left the following written orders at Cape Evans dated 20 October 1911, to secure Scott's speedy return from the pole using dogs:

About the first week of February I should like you to start your third journey to the South, the object being to hasten the return of the third Southern unit [the polar party] and give it a chance to catch the ship. The date of your departure must depend on news received from returning units, the extent of the depot of dog food you have been able to leave at One Ton Camp, the state of the dogs, etc ... It looks at present as though you should aim at meeting the returning party about March 1 in Latitude 82 or 82.30

You will of course understand that whilst the object of the third journey is important that of the second is vital. At all hazards three X.S. units of provision must be got to One Ton Camp by the date named [January 19th], and if the dogs are unable to perform this service, a man party must be organised. (Signed) R. F. Scott.

This order was ultimately not carried out.

Expedition member Apsley Cherry-Garrard initially omitted mentioning Scott's order in his 1922 book The Worst Journey in the World. However, in the 1948 preface to his book, also rediscovered in 2012, he admits to the existence of Scott's order, and explains the order could not have been carried out because insufficient dog food had been laid out (this was Cecil Meares's responsibility, being the dog-driver and the recipient of Scott's order) and because one of the base camp team, Atkinson, was too exhausted at the specified time of departure.
