= Mystery film =

Genre of film

Nick Carter, from France, is one of the first mystery-detective film series (1908–1909).

A mystery film is a film that revolves around the solution of a problem or a crime. It focuses on the efforts of the detective, private investigator or amateur sleuth to solve the mysterious circumstances of an issue by means of clues, investigation, and clever deduction. Mystery films include, but are not limited to, films in the genre of detective fiction.

While cinema featured characters such as Sherlock Holmes in the early 1900s, several other Sherlock Holmes likes characters appeared such as Boston Blackie and The Lone Wolf. Several series of mystery films started in the 1930s with major studios featuring detectives like Nick and Nora Charles, Perry Mason, Nancy Drew and Charlie Chan. While original mystery film series were based on novels, by the 1940s many were sourced from comics and radio series. Towards the 1940s these series were predominantly produced as b-movies, with nearly no mystery series being developed by the 1950s.

Around the 2020s a wave of popular theatrical straight mystery films were released theatrically including Kenneth Branagh's Murder on the Orient Express (2017) and Rian Johnson's Knives Out (2019) as well as on streaming services with the parodic Murder Mystery (2019) starring Adam Sandler.

== Definition and characteristics ==
Mystery films mainly focus on a crime or a puzzle, usually a murder, which must then be solved by policemen, private detectives, or amateur sleuths. The viewer is presented with a series of suspects who have a motive to commit the crime but did not actually do it, and whom the investigator must eliminate during the course of the investigation. At times the viewer is presented with information not available to the main character. The central character usually explores the unsolved crime, unmasks the perpetrator, and puts an end to the effects of the villainy.

During the early 20th century, there was substantial overlap between the genres of detective film and horror film, and the term "mystery" was used to encompass both.

Another common feature of an effective mysteries is unpredictability. The filmmakers design the narrative in such a way as to keep the audience from understanding key facts about the story. In the case of a twist ending, information deliberately hidden throughout the story will be relayed at the very end so that the audience must re-interpret the bulk of the movie with this the benefit of this new information.

== History ==
The works of Arthur Conan Doyle were often adapted to the screen in early cinema, specifically with Sherlock Holmes such as Sherlock Holmes Baffled (1900). Gary Don Rhodes wrote that the large volume of detective films released in the 1910s either owed to Sherlock Holmes but that contemporary reviews such as that of Moving Picture World in 1911 bemoaned the lack of a proper Sherlock Holmes adaptation in "Doctor Doyle's finished style." By 1915 BC, the same trade paper stated that "strange as it may seem, the story of crime mystery is fast degenerating into one of stock properties."

There were several mystery and detective films produced during the silent film era, including numerous films involving Sherlock Holmes, Boston Blackie and The Lone Wolf. Mystery and detective films were among the most popular genres of the silent film era. This ranged to American, British, German and Danish adaptations of Sherlock Holmes and European series like Nick Carter, Nat Pinkerton and Miss Nobody. With the beginning of sound film, mystery film series came into their own with Philo Vance in the 1929 film The Canary Murder Case.A series of films continued in until 1947. Other series followed such as Charlie Chan which began in 1931 and ended in 1949 with 44 films produced.

In the 1930s, most of the major Hollywood film studios produced mystery series, with MGM having Nick and Nora Charles and Joel and Garda Sloane, Warner Bros. having Perry Mason, Torchy Blane, Brass Bancroft and Nancy Drew. Universal had Bill Crane while Fox had Charlie Chan and Mr. Moto.

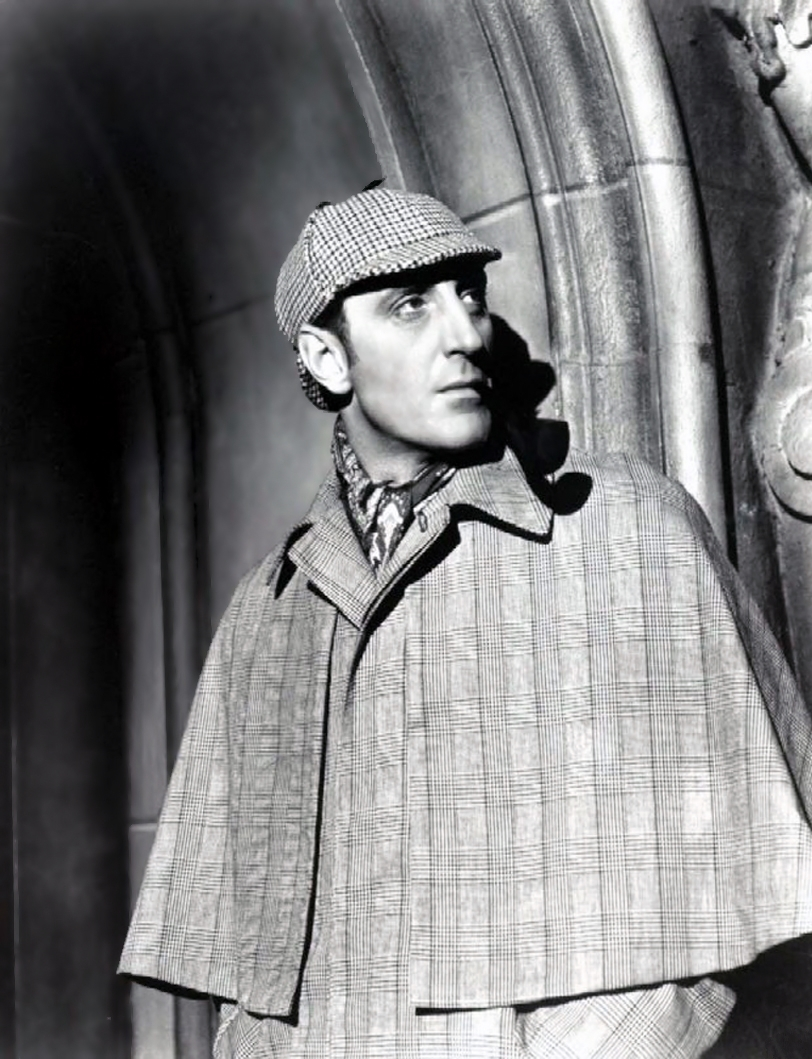
Basil Rathbone as Sherlock Holmes

American mystery film series of the 1930s predominantly relied on mystery literature for inspiration. About every character from the 1930s drew from literature, such as Charlie Chan, Nick and Nora Charles, Thatcher Colt, Perry Mason, and Mr. Wong. The 1930s featured many female detectives of various ages from Nancy Drew, Torchy Blane and Hildegarde Withers while the 1940s had none. Productions in the 1930s were occasionally A-budget pictures such as The Black Camel (1931), Aresene Lupin (1932) and The Thin Man (1934).

By the 1940s, film detectives came from multiple sources, such as radio and comic strips and many others had original scripts. MGM, Warner Brothers, and Paramount had generally halted their production of mystery films by 1942, leaving production of these films being made by RKO, Columbia, Universal and other more minor studios. This led to what author Ron Backer described as 1940s mystery films as being "almost always B-productions" with actors who were "past their prime". These included Chester Morris as Boston Blackie, Warner Baxter as the Crime Doctor, Warren William as the Lone Wolf and Basil Rathbone as Sherlock Holmes. These smaller budget films led to more major productions such as John Huston's The Maltese Falcon (1941) while Murder, My Sweet (1944) introduced the character Philip Marlowe to film. Marlowe would appear again in The Big Sleep (1946) while other films author Martin Rubin deemed as notable detective mysteries included Laura (1944). These detective films drew upon thriller and thriller-related genres with their nocturnal atmosphere and style influenced by expressionism. They often overlapped with film noir, which arose in the mid-1940s and was coined by French critics in 1946. The style was not acknowledge by American filmmakers, critics or audiences while these films were being developed until the 1970s.

Mystery film series disappeared by the 1950s. With the exception of Miss Marple films in the 1960s, it was rare to find films with a female lead that had any sequels. Bran Nicol found that the more traditional "clue-puzzle mystery" was "well-served" by 1960s and 70s film adaptations like The Alphabet Murders (1965), Murder on the Orient Express (1974), and Death on the Nile (1978), the decades following it left mystery adaptations to be made for television as the "default home of sumptuous Golden Age adaptations"

Eric Sandberg (Crime Fiction Studies) stated that while film streaming services were predominantly dominated by iterations of Nordic noir and police procedurals, there have been works inspired by the classical mystery fiction, such as the parodic Murder Mystery starring Adam Sandler and Jennifer Aniston which was one of Netflix's most popular films of 2019. Sandberg noted that only by the 2020s, specifically with Kenneth Branagh's 2017 The Murder on the Orient Express had the genre been financially successful again with more than $350 million grossed worldwide, leading to a sequel Death on the Nile (2022). Other variations of included Rian Johnson's Knives Out which was not an adaptation of a golden age work, but was Johnson's first foray into the "puzzle-mystery" style, and was the second highest-grossing film in America in 2019.

== See also ==
- Mystery fiction
- List of mystery films
- List of film noir
- List of female detective characters
