= Robert Crane =

Robert Crane may refer to:

- Sir Robert Crane, 1st Baronet (1586–1643), English MP
- Bob Crane (1928–1978), American DJ and actor who played Hogan in the sitcom Hogan's Heroes
- Bob Crane (cricketer) (1942–2013), Australian cricketer
- Robert Bruce Crane (1857–1937), American painter
- Robert C. Crane (1920–1962), American newspaper publisher and politician from New Jersey
- Robert Dickson Crane (1929–2021), advisor to Nixon and American short story author
- Robert K. Crane (1919–2010), American biochemist, discovered sodium-glucose cotransport
- Robert Q. Crane (1926–2018), Treasurer and Receiver-General of Massachusetts from 1965 to 1991
- Robbie Crane (born 1969), musician
- Robert Crane, a pseudonym of Bernard Glemser (1908–1990)
- Robotman (Robert Crane), the first Robotman in the DC Universe
- Rob Crane (born 1986), American Olympic sailor
