= Richard Crane =

Richard Crane may refer to:

- Richard Crane (actor) (1918–1969), American character actor
- Richard T. Crane (1832–1912), founder of R.T. Crane & Bro., a Chicago-based manufacturer
- Richard Teller Crane II, United States diplomat
- H. Richard Crane (1907–2007), American physicist
- Sir Richard Crane, 1st Baronet (died 1645), of the Crane baronets
- Richard Crane who wrote the 1983 book and lyrics for Mutiny (musical) for David Essex

== See also ==
- Charles Richard Crane (1858–1939), American businessman
- Crane (surname)
- Castle Hill (Ipswich, Massachusetts), an estate owned by Richard Teller Crane Jr.
