= Stephen Crane (Continental Congress) =

American politician (1709–1780)

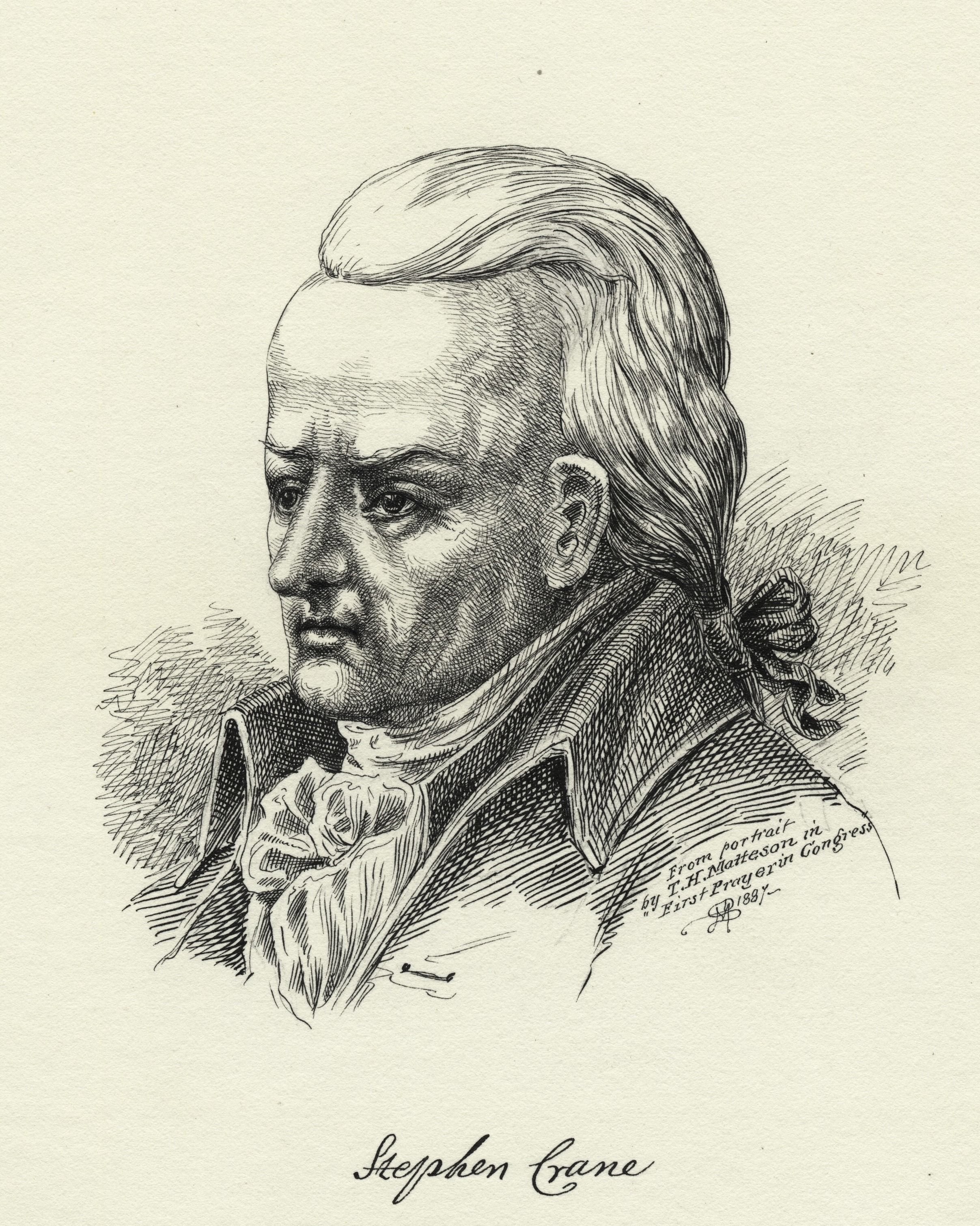

Member of New Jersey Legislative Council
- In office 1779–1780
- Preceded by: Abraham Clark
- Succeeded by: James Caldwell
- In office 1776–1778
- Preceded by: Office created
- Succeeded by: Abraham Clark

22nd Speaker of the New Jersey General Assembly
- In office 1770–1772
- Governor: William Franklin
- Preceded by: Cortlandt Skinner
- Succeeded by: Cortlandt Skinner

Member of the New Jersey General Assembly from the Essex County district
- In office 1766–1775 Serving with John Ogden, Henry Garritse

Personal details
- Born: 1709 Elizabethtown, New Jersey, U.S.
- Died: July 1, 1780 (aged 70–71) Elizabethtown, New Jersey, U.S.
- Resting place: First Presbyterian Church of Elizabeth
- Spouse: Phebe

Stephen Crane (1709 – July 1, 1780) was an American politician from Elizabethtown (present-day Elizabeth, New Jersey) who was a delegate to the Continental Congress from 1774 to 1776 and signed the Continental Association. He also served in the Provincial Congress of New Jersey, New Jersey General Assembly and New Jersey Legislative Council. Stephen did not attend the next Congress in Philadelphia as he needed to attend to divisions in his own state between East Jersey and West Jersey. He felt deeply about the taxes that Britain had imposed upon the Colonies and had made sure of his protest upon his journey to England with Matthias Hatfield.

== Biography ==
Crane was born in Elizabethtown. He served as sheriff of Essex County and was elected as a member of its town committee in 1750. He was also a judge of the court of common pleas. From 1766 to 1773, he was a member of the colony's general assembly from 1766 to 1773 and served as speaker in 1771. He was also mayor of Elizabethtown before he became a member of the Continental Congress. Until his death in 1780, Crane held several public offices in New Jersey.

Crane was bayoneted by Hessian soldiers passing through Elizabethtown on their way to Battle of Springfield on June 23, 1780, and he died of his wounds on July 1, 1780. He was buried at the First Presbyterian Church of Elizabeth with his wife and father, Daniel Crane.

== Family ==
- Phebe Crane, wife (1714-1776)
- William Crane, son; born 1748 in Elizabethtown, served as major of an Essex County, New Jersey regiment. Fought with Richard Montgomery in the Battle of Quebec, received a leg wound that required amputation years later. Promoted to brigadier general in the New Jersey militia after the war.
- Ichabod Bennet Crane (July 18, 1787 – October 1857) grandson; born in Elizabethtown, commissioned a second lieutenant in the United States Marine Corps, served aboard the USS United States.
- Charles Henry Crane (19 July 1825 – October 10, 1883) great-grandson; became a Brigadier General and Surgeon General of the United States (1882–1883).
- Joseph Halsey Crane grandson
- William Crane; (1778–1830) grandson,
- Jonathan Townley Crane, great-grandson, father of author Stephen Crane.
- Stephen Crane; great-great-grandson, author, who is best known for the novel The Red Badge of Courage.
- Bruce Crane; American painter (1857–1937)
