= Charles H. Crane =

American physician

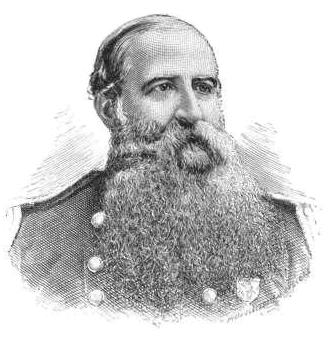
- Born: July 19, 1825; Newport, Rhode Island, U.S.
- Died: October 10, 1883 (aged 58); Washington, D.C., U.S.
- Military career
- Allegiance: United States of America; Union
- Branch: United States Army; Union Army
- Service years: 1848–1883
- Rank: Brigadier general
- Commands: Surgeon General of the Army
- Conflicts: Mexican-American War; American Civil War

Charles Henry Crane (July 19, 1825 – October 10, 1883) was an American medical doctor and the 13th Surgeon General of the United States Army (1882–1883).

== Early life ==
Crane was born on July 19, 1825. He was the son of Colonel Ichabod B. Crane.

Crane received his B.A. from Yale College in 1844. He then went to the Harvard Medical School where he received his M.D. in 1847.

== Career ==
Crane joined the army from Massachusetts on February 14, 1848. In April 1865, Crane was one of the doctors attending President Lincoln at his death. On April 9, 1866, President Andrew Johnson nominated Crane for appointment to the grade of brevet brigadier general in the Regular Army, to rank from March 13, 1865, and the United States Senate confirmed the appointment on May 4, 1866.

On July 29, 1866 Crane was confirmed by the US. Senate to be the Assistant Surgeon General of the Army under Surgeon General Joseph K. Barnes.

Crane began to serve as Acting Surgeon General of the Army when his predecessor resigned. Crane was subsequently nominated by President Chester A. Arthur for the permanent position. Crane's nomination was confirmed by the United States Senate on August 7, 1882, and he formally entered into his office on August 9, 1882.

Crane served as Surgeon General of the Army until his death on October 10, 1883. He was succeeded by Robert Murray.

== See also ==
- List of American Civil War brevet generals (Union)
- List of Massachusetts generals in the American Civil War
- Massachusetts in the American Civil War

== Bibliography ==
- Bowen, James L. (1889). Massachusetts in the War, 1861–1865. Springfield, Massachusetts: Clark W. Bryan & Co. OCLC 1986476.
- Eicher, John H.; Eicher, David J. (2001). Civil War High Commands. Stanford, CA: Stanford University Press. ISBN 978-0-8047-3641-1.
- New York Times Obituary: Surgeon General Crane Dead. An Illness Which Terminates Suddenly - His Probable Successor. New York, NY: New York Times,(October 11, 1883), p. 4.
- New York Times The Senate's Executive Work. John A. Luby Confirmed as Surveyor at Albany – A new Surgeon General., New York, NY: New York Times, (August 8, 1882), p. 1.
- New York Times National Capital Topics; News and Orders for the Army and Navy., New York, NY: New York Times, August 10, 1882, p. 3.
- Pilcher, James Evelyn.: The Surgeon Generals of the Army of the United States of America: A Series of Biographical Sketches of the Senior Officers of the Military Medical Service from the American Revolution to the Philippine Pacification (1905) pp. 64–66
- Special Dispatches to The New York Times, Washington News.; Final Adjournment of Congress to December. Scenes and Incidents of an All Night Session. Sharp Struggle on the Omnibus Appropriation Bill. Increased Pay to Members Goes Through by One Majority. Also a Modified Extension of Bounties. Final Disposition of the Tennessee Senator's Case. Mr. Patterson Permitted to Take the Oath if He Chooses. Passage of the Army Bill Making a Large Increase of Force. The President Supposed to Have Pocketed the Nebraska Bill., New York, NY: New York Times, (July 29, 1866), p. 1.

Preceded by Joseph K. Barnes	Surgeons General of the U. S. Army; 1882–1883	Succeeded by Robert Murray
