= Jonathan Townley Crane =

American clergyman (1819–1880)

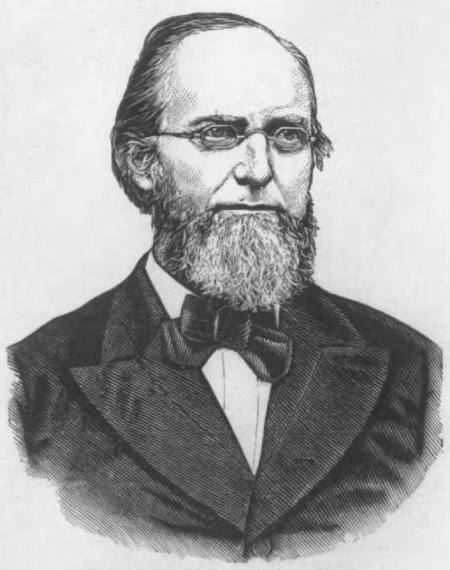
- Born: June 18, 1819; Union Township, New Jersey
- Died: February 16, 1880 (aged 60); Port Jervis, New York
- Burial place: Evergreen Cemetery
- Education: Princeton Theological Seminary
- Occupations: Clergyman, writer
- Spouse: Mary Helen Peck (m. 1848)
- Children: 9, including Stephen Crane and William Howe Crane

Jonathan Townley Crane (June 18, 1819 – February 16, 1880) was an American clergyman, author and abolitionist. He was born in Connecticut Farms, in Union Township, New Jersey, and is most widely known as the father of writer Stephen Crane.

== Early years ==
Crane was the son of William Crane (1778-1830) and Sarah Townley (1776-1830), who both died when he was 13 years old. He was subsequently apprenticed to a trunk maker in Newark. Although raised in the Congregational church, he rejected its deterministic teachings. Accidentally, in 1838, he wandered into a Revival meeting, and was converted to Methodism.

=== Education ===
He graduated from the Princeton Theological Seminary in Princeton, New Jersey in 1843 and in 1844 was licensed to preach, after which he was admitted to the New Jersey Annual conference of the Methodist Episcopal Church in 1845. Dickinson College conferred upon him the Doctorate of Divinity in 1856.

== Career ==
Throughout his career as an educator, pastor and writer, Crane was active in local temperance movements, and strongly supported abolitionist causes.

=== Ministry ===
In 1846, he was stationed as pastor at Hope Township, Warren County, New Jersey, and in 1847 at Belvidere, New Jersey. In 1848–49, he was the pastor at Orange, New Jersey, and in June 1849, was elected principal of the Conference school and seminary at Pennington, New Jersey, the post from which he resigned in 1858 to become pastor of Trinity Church in Jersey City, New Jersey. From 1863 to 1865, he was the pastor of another large and important church, the Methodist Episcopal Church in Morristown, New Jersey. In 1868–72, he was the presiding elder of the Newark, New Jersey district, during which time his son Stephen was born. Crane was a delegate to the General conferences of 1860, 1864, 1868, and 1872 while he was the elder of the Newark (1868-1872) and Elizabeth districts (1872–76). He rejected the mid-19th century Holiness Movement of Christian perfection as unattainable and unreasonable; Crane's opposition subsequently limited his advancement as an administrator in the Methodist Episcopal denomination and drew the wrath of his father-in-law, Bishop George Peck. After his administrative career ended, he returned to parish work, serving at Cross Street Church in Paterson, New Jersey, and then to Drew Methodist Episcopal Church in Port Jervis, New York.

=== Writer ===
As a religious writer, his contributions appeared largely in the periodical literature of his denomination. Most notably, he wrote "Essay on Dancing" (1848) in which he expounded its evils; despite his own personal lack of experience with dancing, he claimed he understood its evils. His books, The Right Way, or Practical Lectures on the Decalogue (1853) and Popular Amusements (1869), in which he described how even the most apparently innocent amusements led people into sin were aimed at juvenile audiences. In Arts of Intoxication (1870), he wrote against alcoholic beverages of any kind and advocated temperance. He also wrote theological tracts Holiness, the Birthright of all God's Children (1874) and Methodism and its Methods (1875).

Crane's literary works traditionally have been used as a foil for his son's urban grittiness, but more recent scholarship posits his writing as a critique of nineteenth century social failures to address problems of poverty, disease, education, and employment. In his "Christ and the Painters", which was published in the Sunday School Times in 1877, he criticized the sentimental piety of contemporary painters who depicted Jesus blessing a clutch of rosy cheeked children; such "specimens of infantile innocence and grace" as were portrayed in these paintings were "perhaps just such a lot of little wretches as the modern traveler in that same region sees crawling out of their mud huts, dirty, unkempt, ragged, or without even a rag, to stare at him with their sore eyes." He rejected his contemporaries overly simplistic sentimentality that desensitized people to the real and abject problems of their fellow beings. The poison of sectionalism, he further explained in Methodism and its Methods, had distracted Christians from the real work of the Gospel, which was living the Word.

=== Educator ===
While presiding elder of the Newark District, Crane helped to found the Centenary Collegiate Institute, now known as Centenary University, in Hackettstown, New Jersey, in 1867, which was originally a coeducational preparatory school for girls. Both of his daughters attended the school, and his son Edmund was a librarian there. He also founded a school in Port Jervis to serve the African American population; one of his daughters taught there for several years. He was also involved in the founding of the Ocean Grove Camp Meeting Association in 1869.

Crane died in Port Jervis on February 16, 1880, and was buried at Evergreen Cemetery.

== Family ==
- Mary Helen Peck (1827-1891), wife; married 1848. She was the daughter of an itinerant Wilkes-Barre, Pennsylvania clergyman, George Peck, who, at the time, was also the editor of the Methodist Quarterly Review. Like her husband, Mary Helen Peck was an ardent abolitionist and an even more ardent member of the temperance movement. They had fourteen children, although only nine survived into adulthood. After her husband's death, she moved to the predominantly Methodist Episcopal community at Asbury Park, New Jersey, where she bought a small cottage, Arbutus Cottage.
- William Crane (1778-1830), father
- Sarah Townley mother; descendant of Colonel Richard Townley
- Joseph Crane; grandfather, brother of General William Crane who was the father of Ichabod Crane.
- Stephen Crane (1709-1780), great-grandfather. Member of First Continental Congress.

=== Children ===
1. Mary Helen Crane (1849–1933), wrote children stories for Frank Leslie's Illustrated Gazette
2. George Peck Crane (1850–1903), Postal Service employee, railroad employee.
3. Jonathan Townley Crane, Jr. (1853–1908), known as "Townley". Reporter in Asbury Park, New Jersey.
4. William Howe Crane (1854–1926), attended Centenary, graduated from Albany Law, had an independent law practice in Port Jervis, New York.
5. Agnes Elizabeth Crane (1856–1884), teacher.
6. Edmund Brian Crane (1857–1922).
7. Wilbur Fiske Crane (1858–1918), known as "Burt".
8. Luther Peck Crane (1863–1886), flagman and brakeman for Erie Railroad; fell under the wheels of an ongoing train when a round rock turned and threw him down on the rails.
9. Stephen Crane (1871–1900), journalist, poet, novelist, author of The Red Badge of Courage.

== Crane's contemporary published work ==
- The Art of Intoxication: Its Aims and Results, University of Michigan Library, Ann Arbor, MI 2006, ISBN 978-1-4255-2398-5
- Popular Amusements, University of Michigan Library, Ann Arbor, MI 2006, ISBN 978-1-4255-1735-9
