= George Peck (clergyman) =

Church minister (1797–1876)

George Peck (August 8, 1797 – May 20, 1876) was a minister in the Methodist Episcopal Church who helped to found Cazenovia Seminary, and became its president in 1835.

== Career ==
Peck received his Exhorter's License in 1815 and, in 1816, his local preacher's license. He served a year on the Cortland Circuit as a circuit rider, during which he visited small villages and hamlets throughout western New York, preached in the open air and people's parlors, occasionally in a church, without remuneration. In 1816, he joined the Genesee Conference.

Later, he convinced local farmers and businessmen to fund a Methodist Episcopal Seminary in Kingston, Pennsylvania, called Wyoming Seminary. After several two year pastoral assignments (two years was the standard in the Methodist Episcopal church at the time), he became editor of the Methodist Quarterly Review, the denomination's primary periodical, and general book editor of the denomination's publishing program from 1848–51; he followed this with a term as editor of the Christian Advocate, from 1852 to 1853.

In the 1860s and 1870s, he took an active role in supporting the Holiness movement. The movement gained widespread support for its emphasis on which called upon adult conversions through which individuals sought Christian perfection; its sentimentality also created controversy and its critics claimed that the movement undermined the reality of the social gospel.

== Family ==
Peck was born in 1791 in Middlefield, New York, to Luther Peck, a blacksmith, and Annis née Collar. He and his four brothers became ministers and one, Jesse T. Peck, became a bishop. The trend in his family toward the Methodist ministry led his grandson, Stephen Crane, to say: "Upon my mother's side, everyone in my family became a Methodist clergyman as soon as they could walk, the ambling-nag, saddlebag, exhorting kind."

On June 19, 1819, he married Mary Myers of Forty Fort, Pennsylvania. They had four children: George M. and Luther Wesley, who became ministers in the same conference as their father; Wilbur Fiske, a medical doctor; and Mary Helen, a writer and mother of Stephen Crane. Peck died May 20, 1876, in Scranton, Pennsylvania, and was buried in Forty Fort Meeting.

== Published works ==
As director of the Methodist Episcopal Church's publishing concern, Peck was responsible for several historical biographies in what was then the new style of historiography, drawing on the use of original documents. These included a biography of John Wycliffe, and a history of the Wesley family. Peck was also editor of The Methodist Almanac published by Lane and Tippett.

He also published several tracts of his own work, most which were connected to the Holiness movement of the 1840s and 1850s.

- Christian exertion, or, The duty of private members of the Church of Christ to labor for the souls of men. s.n. 1845.
- National Evils and their Remedies: a discourse delivered on the occasion of the national fast, May 14, 1841, in the Methodist Episcopal Church, Greene-Street, New-York New York. G. Lane, 1841.
- Appeal from tradition and common sense, or an answer to the question, what constitutes the divine rule of faith and practice. New York. G. Lane, 1844.
- The Scripture doctrine of Christian perfection stated and defended: with practical illustrations and advices. In a series of lectures. Abridged from the author’s larger work. New York, Lane and Tippett, 1845.
- Slavery and the Episcopacy: being an examination of Dr. Bascom’s review of the reply of the majority to the protest of the minority of the late General conference of the M.E. Church, in the case of Bishop Andrew. New York, G. Lane & C.B. Tippett, 1845.
- Scripture doctrine of Christian perfection, with practical illustrations and advices in a series of lectures. New York, Lane & Scott, 1851.
- Lives of the apostles and evangelists. New-York, Pub. by Lane & Scott, for the Sunday-school union of the Methodist Episcopal church. 1851.
- The formation of manly character: a series of lectures to young men. New York, Carlton & Phillips, 1853.
- Wyoming (Pennsylvania) its history, stirring incidents and romantic adventures. New York, Harper & Brothers, 1858.
- Scripture doctrine of Christian perfection stated and defended: with a critical and historical examination of the controversy, ancient and modern. 1860.
- Early Methodism within the bounds of the old Genesee Conference. 1860.
- Our country, its trial and triumph, A series of discourses suggested by the varying events of the war for the union. New York, Carlton & Porter, 1865.

His Sketches & incidents, or, A budget from the saddle-bags of a superannuated itinerant and Life and Times of Reverend George Peck, DD, offered insight into the challenges facing the itinerant clergyman, or circuit rider, as they had been called; by the time he published his memoirs in 1874, these roles for clergyman had long since disappeared.

== Biographies ==
- Peck, Rev. J.K., Luther Peck and His Five Sons, 1897.
- Weyburn, S. Fletcher, History of a distinctive family of Scranton and Lackawanna County, Pennsylvania. Lackawanna historical society, 1929.

== Sources ==
- Chaffee, Amasa Franklin "George Peck," History of the Wyoming Conference of the Methodist Episcopal Church. New York: Eaton & Mains, 1904, pp. 220–223. Found in USGenWeb Archives. Accessed 26 August 2009.
