= Krane =

Krane is a surname of German origin. Notable people with the surname include:

- Dammy Krane (born 1992), Nigerian musician
- David Krane (born 1972), American businessman
- Jonathan D. Krane (1952–2016), American film producer
- Kristoff Krane (born 1983), American hip hop artist
- Steven C. Krane (1957–2010), American lawyer
- Zachary Krane, known as KRANE, American electronic musician

== See also ==
- Crane (surname)
