= Jonathan Crane =

Jonathan or John Crane may refer to:

- Jonathan Crane (politician) (1750–1820), politician in Nova Scotia
- Jonathan Townley Crane (1819–1880), American clergyman, author and abolitionist
- John Crane (American politician), politician in Indiana
- John Crane (Australian politician) (1868–1948), member of the New South Wales Legislative Assembly
- John Crane (Canadian politician) (born 1935), Canadian politician
- John Crane (comptroller), English soldier based at Berwick-upon-Tweed
- John Crane (government official), U.S. Inspector General who supports whistleblowers
- John Crane (soldier) (1744–1805), participant in the Boston Tea Party and a soldier during the American Revolutionary War
- John Crane (writer) (born 1962), writer and television producer
- Jonathan Crane (actor), see The Daleks

Companies

- John Crane Group, manufacturer of mechanical seals.

Fictional characters

- Scarecrow (DC Comics), also known as Dr. Jonathan Crane, DC Comics supervillain and enemy of Batman

== See also ==
- Jack Crain (1920–1994), American football player
