= Patrick Gaines Goode =

American politician

Patrick G. Goode
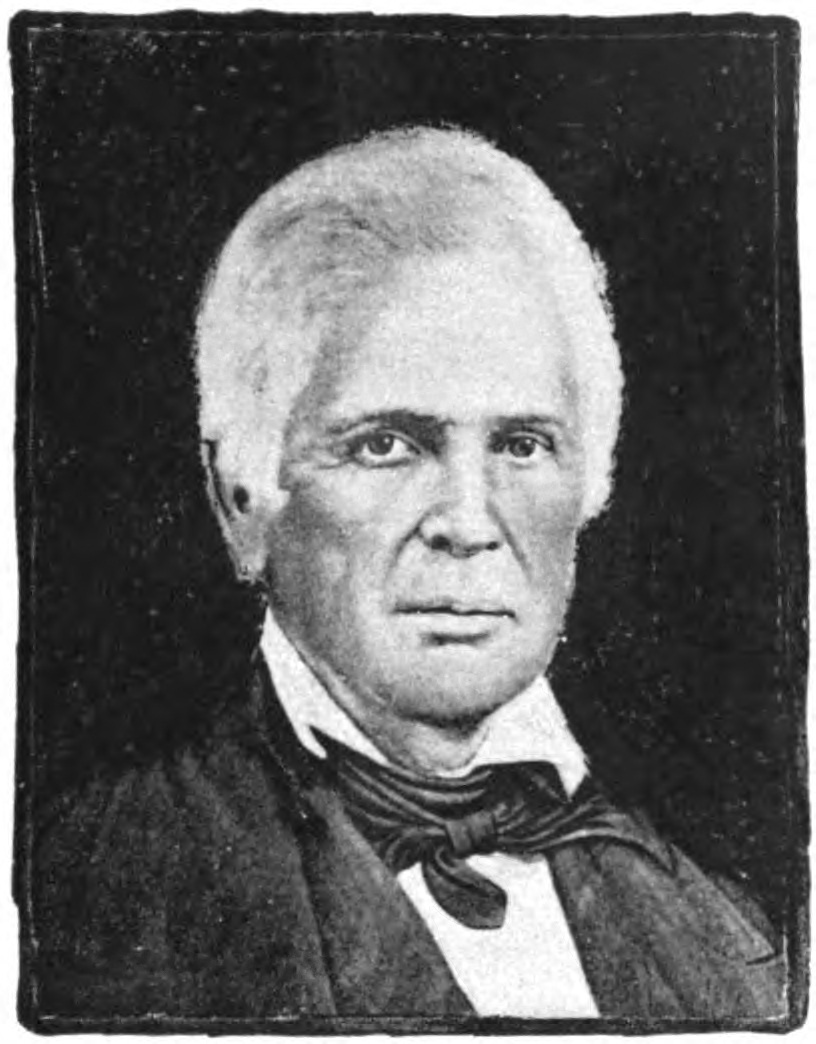

Member of the U.S. House of Representatives from Ohio's 3rd district
- In office March 4, 1837 – March 3, 1843
- Preceded by: Joseph Halsey Crane
- Succeeded by: Robert C. Schenck

Member of the Ohio House of Representatives
- In office 1833-1834

Personal details
- Born: Patrick Gaines Goode; May 10, 1798 Charlotte County, Virginia
- Died: October 17, 1862 (aged 64) Sidney, Ohio
- Resting place: Graceland Cemetery
- Party: Whig

Patrick Gaines Goode (May 10, 1798 – October 17, 1862) was a lawyer, legislator, jurist, clergyman, educator and civic leader. From 1837 to 1843, he served 3 terms in the U.S. House of Representatives.

== Biography ==
Goode was born in Cornwall parish, Charlotte County, Virginia (several sources give it as adjacent Prince Edward County). He was a descendant of John Goode of Cornwall England who had settled in Virginia prior to 1660. He moved with his parents, Philip and Rebekah (Hayes) Goode, to Wayne County, Ohio in 1805. They moved to Xenia, Ohio in 1814 where Patrick attended Xenia Academy and then the Espy school in Philadelphia, Pennsylvania. He studied law under Judge Joshua Collett in Lebanon, Ohio and was admitted to the bar in 1821.

Goode married Mary Whiteman on July 3, 1822 in Greene County, Ohio. They had one son, Benedict Whiteman Goode, and two daughters Catharine Rebekah Goode and Maria Louisa Goode.

Goode practiced law in Madison, Indiana and then in Shelby County, Ohio.

In 1831, Goode was a commissioner charged with locating the county seat of Allen County, Ohio. He had the honor of naming the newly surveyed town and borrowed the name from Lima, the capital of Peru, and it was said that "to his last day would not forgive the public for their resolute abandonment of the Spanish pronunciation of the name."

=== Congress ===
Goode was elected to the Ohio House of Representatives in 1833 and 1834. He was put up for Speaker of the Ohio House, but was defeated after several ballots. He was elected as a Whig to the Twenty-fifth, Twenty-sixth, and Twenty-seventh Congresses from Ohio's 3rd congressional district. He did not stand for renomination in 1842.

=== Later life and career ===
Goode was a local preacher nearly all his life and occupied a pulpit almost every Sunday while in Washington, D.C. during his congressional career.

In 1844, he became judge for one term of the Court of Common Pleas in the newly created Sixteenth Judicial District of Ohio spanning ten counties (Shelby, Mercer, Allen, Hardin, Hancock, Putnam, Paulding, Van Wert, Williams and Defiance). When the Seventeenth district was formed in 1848, five of the northern counties were taken from the Sixteenth, but Auglaize was added. Judge Goode was one of the last circuit-riding judges.

At the conclusion of his term of office in 1851, Judge Goode retired from the legal profession and joined the Methodist Episcopal clergy in the Central Ohio Conference and preached until near the close of his life. He was located for a time at Anna, Ohio and Wapakoneta, Ohio. His knowledge of parliamentary procedure was shared by so few men in the pulpit that he was in great demand at the Conferences.

=== Death and burial ===
Goode died in Sidney, Ohio two weeks after the Conference at Greenville in 1862. He is interred in Graceland Cemetery.

U.S. House of Representatives
Preceded by Joseph Halsey Crane	U.S. Representative from Ohio's 3rd district 1837 - 1843	Succeeded by Robert C. Schenck
Ohio House of Representatives
Preceded by Justin Hamilton	Representative from Northwest Ohio district December 2, 1833-December 6, 1835	Succeeded by Stacy Taylor
