= Edward Crane =

Edward Crane may refer to:

- Ed Crane (baseball) (1862–1896), American right-handed pitcher and outfielder in Major League Baseball
- Ed Crane (executive) (1944–2026), founder of the Cato Institute
- Ed Crane (journalist), reporter for CBS News
- Eddie Crane, fictional canine character on sitcom Frasier
