= William Crain =

William Crain may refer to:

- William H. Crain (1848–1896), U.S. Representative from Texas
- William Crain (filmmaker) (born 1949), American film and television director
- William C. Crain (1798–1865), American physician and politician
- William J. Crain (born 1961 or 1962), Louisiana Supreme Court Justice

== See also ==
- William Crane (disambiguation)
