= University of Queensland Cricket Club =

- Nickname: University
- League: Queensland Premier Cricket

Personnel
- Captain: (Australia) TBA
- Coach: (Australia) TBA

Team information
- Founded: 1911
- Capacity: 5,000

History
- Grade wins: 13
- 1-Day wins: 14
- T20 wins: 6
- Official website: uqcricket.com.au

The University of Queensland Cricket Club is a cricket club on the University of Queensland, Queensland, Australia. The club plays in the Queensland Premier Cricket competition. It was founded in 1911.

Past students of the University of Queensland who were members of the cricket club include-

- Clem Jones
- William Edward Pender (WEP) Harris
- George Corones
- Owen Lloyd
- Ken Archer
- Tom Veivers
- John Biggs
- David Ogilvie
- Bob Crane
- Bob Mihell
- Lew Cooper
- Martin Love
- Michael Kasprowicz
- Wade Seccombe

The main oval for the club is the WEP Harris Oval.

== See also ==
- Cricket in Queensland
