= Frank Crane (politician) =

American politician

Frank Crane (born in Wisconsin in 1855) was Chairman of the Republican Party of South Dakota from 1900 to 1906. Previously, he had been Superintendent of Public Instruction of South Dakota from 1895 to 1899.
