= Robert Murray (physician) =

Surgeon General of the United States Army (1822-1913)

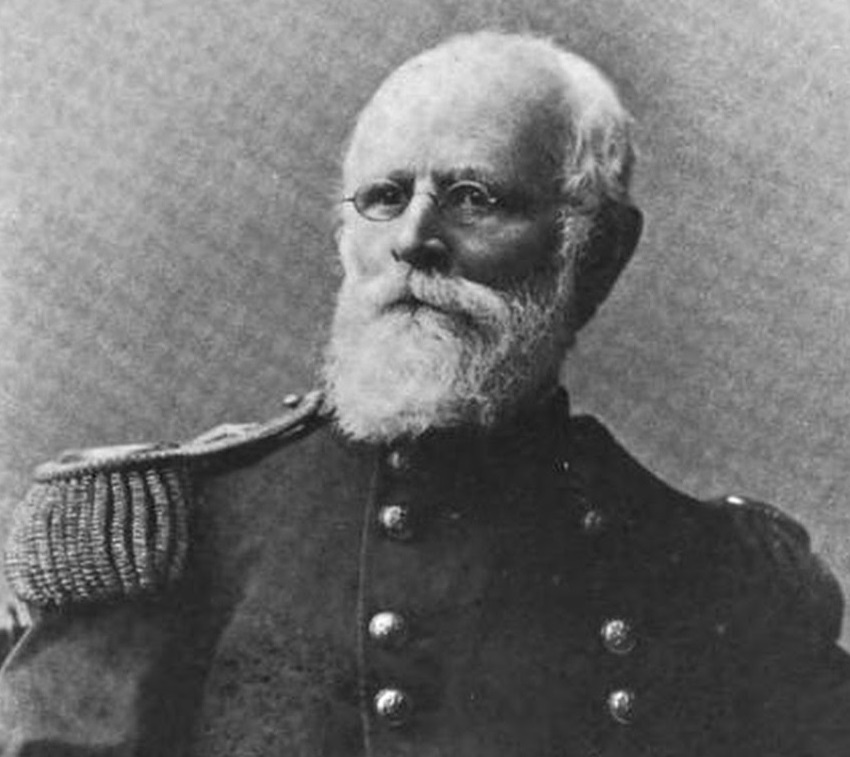
- From 1905's The Surgeon Generals of the Army of the United States of America
- Born: August 6, 1822; Elkridge, Maryland, U.S.
- Died: January 1, 1913 (aged 90); Baltimore, Maryland, U.S.
- Burial place: Grace Episcopal Church Cemetery in Elkridge, Maryland, U.S.
- Spouse: Adelaide Atwood (1834–1892) (m. 1861)
- Children: 3
- Military career
- Allegiance: United States of America
- Branch: United States Army
- Service years: 1846–1886
- Rank: Brigadier General
- Commands: Surgeon General of the Army
- Conflicts: Mexican–American War; American Civil War

Robert Murray (August 6, 1822 – January 1, 1913) was a physician and career officer in the United States Army. He attained the rank of brigadier general, and served as Surgeon General of the United States Army from 1883 to 1886.From 1910 to 1911 he was vice president, from 1911 to 1912 president of the Aztec Club of 1847.

== Early life and education ==
Robert Murray was born in Elkridge, Maryland on August 6, 1822, the son of United States Navy officer Daniel Murray and Mary (Dorsey) Murray. He was educated in the local schools and by private tutors, and then began a business career in the offices of Baltimore merchant W. G. Harrison. He later decided on a medical career, and attended the University of Maryland, Baltimore before transferring to the University of Pennsylvania's medical school, from which he received his M.D. degree in 1843. Murray completed his internship and residency at Baltimore's Alms House Hospital.

== Career ==
=== U.S. Army ===
In 1846, Murray joined the United States Army as a contracted assistant surgeon, and was posted to Fort Gratiot, Michigan. He soon passed the examination for appointment in the Army, and received his commission as a first lieutenant. Later in 1846, Murray was ordered to duty in California, and after traveling by ship from New York City to San Francisco, he carried out Mexican–American War assignments at military posts in Los Angeles, Monterey, and Sacramento.

Murray was assigned as surgeon at Boston's Fort Independence in 1850, and he was promoted to captain in 1851. In 1852 he was ordered to New York City after his selection as assistant to Major Thomas Gardiner Mower, the Army's Senior Surgeon and Chief Medical Purveyor. When Mower died in December 1853, Murray assumed his duties and served until the summer of 1854, when he returned to California. He served at several posts during his second tour of duty there, and worked with other doctors in the state to quell the rampant typhoid fever that accompanied the large population explosion following the U.S. acquisition of California following the war with Mexico. In 1860, Murray was promoted to surgeon with the rank of major.

=== Civil War ===
Murray was one of four brothers; two fought on the side of the Confederate States of America, and the third remained loyal to the Union. In the spring of 1861, Murray was ordered to Washington, DC, where he served on the selection board for doctors applying to join the expanding Union Army. Following the First Battle of Bull Run, Murray took part in the organization and staffing of hospitals in and around Alexandria, Virginia.

In September 1861, Murray was ordered to Kentucky, where he joined the newly formed Army of the Cumberland (first called the Army of the Ohio) as Medical Director. He took part in the organization's campaigns in Kentucky, Tennessee, Mississippi, and Alabama, and served until he was reassigned in 1863.

Murray was posted to the Army's Philadelphia depot and assigned as its Chief Medical Purveyor. He was responsible for expending and accounting for several million dollars as he acquired medical supplies and equipment for the Union Army, and distributed them to units throughout the country. He remained in this position until the end of the war, and received brevet promotions to lieutenant colonel and colonel to recognize his superior performance of duty.

=== Post-Civil War ===
In 1865, Murray returned to California, where he assigned as the Chief Medical Purveyor for the army on the west coast. Based in San Francisco, Murray was promoted to lieutenant colonel in 1866, and colonel in 1870.

Murray was assigned as Medical Director for the Division of the Missouri in 1870, and he served until 1880. He was Medical Director for the Department of the Atlantic from 1880 to 1883, and in 1882 seniority elevated him to the additional duty of Assistant Surgeon General of the United States Army.

==== U.S. Army Surgeon General ====
In November 1883, Murray was appointed as Surgeon General of the United States Army with the rank of brigadier general. He served until reaching the mandatory retirement age of 64 in 1886.

During Murray's tenure, the Army began to make advances in the areas of antisepsis and antiseptic surgery, with antiseptic operating rooms becoming common in 1883 and 1884. Based on his experiences with typhoid and other communicable diseases, Murray advocated for improvements to hygiene at military posts, including identifying the contamination of water supplies as a likely cause of disease outbreaks, and recommending the disposal of garbage by incineration.

== Retirement and death ==
In retirement, Murray was a resident of Elkridge, Maryland. He traveled extensively, including tours of several European countries, and he served as president of the Aztec Club of 1847 from 1911 to 1912. He was an advocate for creation of the Association of Military Surgeons of the United States, and when the organization formed in 1891, Murray was included as an honorary member.

Murray died in Baltimore, on January 1, 1913. He was buried at Grace Episcopal Church Cemetery in Elkridge. At the time of his death, Murray was one of only four Mexican-American War veterans on the Army's pension rolls.

== Personal life ==
In 1861, Murray married Adelaide Atwood (1834–1892) in Benicia, California. They were the parents of sons Robert Dorsey Murray (1862–1950), John Donaldson Murray (1866–1943), and Francis Edward Murray (1864–1871).

== Sources ==
=== Magazines ===
- "Obituary, Robert Murray". The Military Surgeon. Vol. XXXII, no. 4. Chicago, IL: Association of Military Surgeons of the United States. April 1913.

=== Books ===
- Gillett, Mary C. (1987). The Army Medical Department, 1818–1865. Washington, DC: United States Army Center for Military History.
- Pilcher, James Evelyn (1905). The Surgeon Generals of the Army of the United States of America. Carlisle, PA: Association of Military Surgeons of the United States.

=== Internet ===
- Office of Medical History (February 20, 2009). "Surgeons General Biographies: Robert Murray". amedd.army.mil. Fort Sam Houston, TX: U.S. Army Medical Department. Archived from the original on December 3, 2010.
- "Pennsylvania and New Jersey Church and Town Records, 1669–2013, Baptism Record for Francis Edward Murray". Ancestry.com. Provo, UT: Ancestry.com, LLC. February 14, 1865.
- "California County Birth, Marriage, and Death Records, 1849–1980, Death Record for Francis Edward Murray". Ancestry.com. Provo, UT: Ancestry.com, LLC. May 29, 1871.

=== Newspapers ===
- "Gen. Robert Murray Dies at 91" (PDF). The New York Times. New York, NY. January 2, 1913.
- "Gen. Robert Murray Dead". The Baltimore Sun. Baltimore, MD. January 2, 1913 – via Newspapers.com.
- "Gen. Robert Murray, U.S.A.". The Sun. New York, NY. January 3, 1913 – via Newspapers.com.
- "Funeral Notice, Gen. Robert Murray". The Baltimore Sun. Baltimore, MD. January 5, 1913 – via Newspapers.com.
