= Thomas Crane =

Thomas or Tom Crane may refer to:

- Thomas Crane (1808–1859), English portrait painter
- Thomas Crane (1843–1903), English illustrator and designer, son of the painter
- Thomas Frederick Crane (1844–1927), American folklorist, academic, and lawyer
- Thomas Crane (1803–1875), American businessman and namesake of Massachusetts' Thomas Crane Public Library
- Thomas Crane, Australian singer and Australia's Got Talent contestant
- Tom Crane (footballer) (1921–2010), Australian rules footballer
- Tom Crane, character on the 1979 TV series The Omega Factor
