= James Crane =

James Crane may refer to:

- James Crane (actor) (1889–1968), American stage and screen actor
- James Crane (police officer) (1921–1994), British police officer
- James L. Crane, American football coach
- Jim Crane (born 1954), American businessman and baseball team owner

== See also ==
- Jimmie Crane, American songwriter
