= Jesse Truesdell Peck =

American bishop (1811–1883)

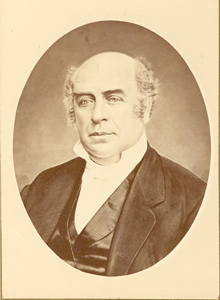

Tenth president of Dickinson College
- In office 1848 – June 1852
- Preceded by: William Henry Allen (Acting))
- Succeeded by: Charles Collins

Personal details
- Born: April 4, 1811 Middlefield Center, Otsego County, New York, United States
- Died: May 17, 1883 (aged 72) Syracuse, New York
- Resting place: Oakwood Cemetery
- Profession: Bishop

Jesse Truesdell Peck (April 4, 1811 – May 17, 1883) was an American bishop of the Methodist Episcopal Church, elected in 1872.

== Birth and family ==
He was born on April 4, 1811, in Middlefield Center, Otsego County, New York. His family was of English heritage, traceable back to the 15th century and known in heraldry. Henry Peck came to America in 1637. Jesse Peck's grandfather, also named Jesse, died in Washington's army. Jesse Peck's father, Luther, was a blacksmith and lifelong class leader, whose five sons (of whom Jesse T. was the youngest) all became Methodist preachers. The trend in his family toward the Methodist ministry led his great-nephew, Stephen Crane, to say: "Upon my mother's side, everyone in my family became a Methodist clergyman as soon as they could walk, the ambling-nag, saddlebag, exhorting kind."

== Ordained ministry ==
Peck was converted to the Christian faith at the age of 16. He sensed a call to preach almost immediately. He entered the traveling ministry as a circuit rider of the Oneida Annual Conference of the M.E. Church in 1832. He was ordained by bishops Elijah Hedding and Beverly Waugh. Prior to his election to the episcopacy, Peck served as a pastor and a presiding elder. As a bishop, he was a delegate to the First Ecumenical Conference, 1881.

== Presidency at Dickinson ==
In 1848, he was elected the tenth president of Dickinson College, in Carlisle, Pennsylvania. During his presidency, Peck was unpopular with the students. In one student prank, he was detained in an insane asylum in Staunton, Virginia, where he had traveled for a church conference. Students locked Peck in a railroad boxcar overnight and another time, shot, and killed, his dog. On top of all of these problems with the students, Peck proved to be an inadequate fundraiser for the college; in June 1851, he announced his intention to leave the institution the following year, citing his belief that he was ill-suited to the tasks associated with the job. In July 1852, he gave the address to the graduating class, entitled God in Education.

== Syracuse University ==
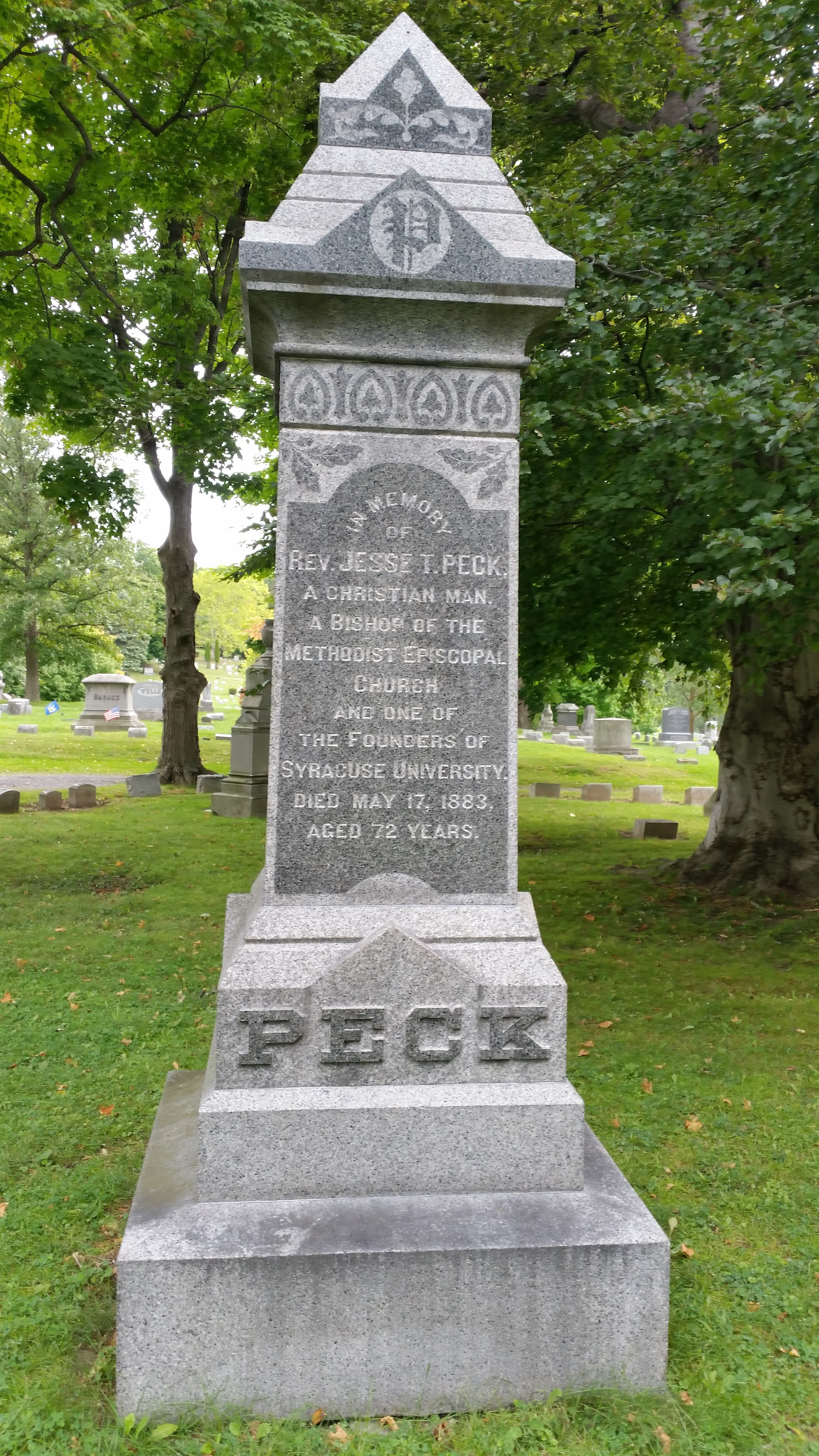
Memorial to Rev. Jesse T. Peck, Oakwood Cemetery, Syracuse, New York

Though not a college graduate himself, Peck was prominent in the beginnings of Syracuse University, serving as the first chairman of its board of trustees. He developed what became, in effect, the university's first master plan: a scheme for the construction of seven buildings on land donated by George F. Comstock, also a member of the Board. Each building was to be dedicated to a different academic discipline. Peck's vision for the new campus was one of stylistic eclecticism; on one occasion declaring that the new university should "demonstrate the perfect harmony and indissoluble oneness of all that is valuable in the old and the new." The first building completed under this plan was the Hall of Languages, built at the summit of University Avenue in Syracuse. Nationally renowned architect Horatio Nelson White was the designer of this French Second Empire structure.

Peck died May 17, 1883, in Syracuse and is buried there in the Oakwood Cemetery.

== Selected writings ==
- Sermon: Talent, in Clark, D.W., The Methodist Pulpit, 1897.
- The Central Idea of Christianity, 1857. Also, revised, 1876 and later. Also Chapter V of this book a pamphlet with the same topic, 1902.
- The True Woman, 1857.
- What Must I Do to Be Saved?, 1858.
- Sermon: The Life Battle, in The New York Pulpit in the Revival of 1858, A Memorial Volume.
- Address: Centenary Conv., Boston, 1866, Proceedings.
- History of the Great Republic, 1868.
- Biography of Mary Brison, in Our Excellent Women, pub. by James Miller, 1872.
- Addresses State Convs, N.J., 1870, political; N.Y., 1870, Public Schools, N.Y., 1871, Political Reform.
- Sermon in Fraternal Camp-Meeting Sermons, Round Lake, 1875.
- Reader of the Address published by the First Ecumenical Methodist Conference, City Road, London, 1881. The preparation of the paper was largely in his hands.

== Biographies ==
- Peck, Rev. J.K., Luther Peck and His Five Sons, 1897.

== See also ==
- List of bishops of the United Methodist Church
- Syracuse University
- Mary Helen Peck Crane
