= Joseph H. Crane =

American politician (1782–1851)

Joseph Halsey Crane

Member of the U.S. House of Representatives from Ohio's 3rd district
- In office March 4, 1829 – March 3, 1837
- Preceded by: William McLean
- Succeeded by: Patrick Gaines Goode

Member of the Ohio House of Representatives
- In office 1809

Personal details
- Born: August 31, 1782 Elizabethtown, New Jersey
- Died: November 13, 1851 (aged 69) Dayton, Ohio
- Resting place: Woodland Cemetery, Dayton, Ohio
- Party: Anti-Jacksonian
- Education: Princeton University

Joseph Halsey Crane (August 31, 1782 – November 13, 1851) was an attorney, soldier, jurist, and legislator. He was born in Elizabethtown, New Jersey He was the son of General Wiliam Crane and Abigail (Miller) Crane and the grandson of Stephen Crane, member of the First Continental Congress, his brother was Colonel Ichabod B. Crane.

Joseph Crane was a student at Princeton College. He studied law with Governor Aaron Ogden and was admitted to the bar of New Jersey in 1802 and practiced there briefly. He went to Dayton, Ohio in 1804 and became the first attorney to practice in there. Crane took on Daniel C. Cooper as a client.

In 1809, Joseph Halsey Crane married Julia Ann Elliott, the daughter of one of Dayton's first doctors, Dr. John Elliott, who was a surgeon in the United States Army during the Revolution and had been at Vincennes, Indiana with General "Mad Anthony" Wayne and General Arthur St. Clair. Joseph and Julia had a large family, but most of the children, like Ann (died February 22, 1812, aged 18 months), died young. Two sons, William Elliott Crane and Joseph Graham Crane, followed their father into the legal profession. His son Joseph, brevetted a major in the Army of the Potomac for his participation in the Second Battle of Bull Run, later became mayor of Jackson, Mississippi during the Reconstruction era in the south. He was stabbed to death by a former colonel in the Confederate Army named Edward M. Yerger.

He was elected a member of the Ohio House of Representatives in 1809. During the session in Columbus, Ohio, he authored the Practice Act – modeled after the practice of the Court of Common Pleas at Westminster Hall – under which legal proceedings in Ohio were regulated until the adoption of the revised constitution of 1851.

Joseph Crane served in the War of 1812 as a private, Fifth Brigade, First Division of the Ohio Militia. His brother Ichabod Crane served as a captain in the United States Army during the war.

He was Montgomery County recorder in 1813 and prosecuting attorney of the county from 1813 to 1816. In 1814, he was on the Board of Directors of Dayton's first bank, the Dayton Manufacturing Company. In 1819, he was a Trustee at the founding of the Dayton Academy.

Joseph Halsey Crane was elected President Judge of the Ohio First Circuit Court of Common Pleas in 1817 serving two terms until he resigned in 1829 to take his seat in Congress. He was elected in 1828 as an Anti-Jacksonian from Ohio's 3rd congressional district to the Twenty-first Congress. He was subsequently elected to three more terms, serving until 1837. He declined to be a candidate for renomination in 1836.

Joseph H. Crane returned to Dayton after his congressional service and resumed the practice of law. For several years from 1831, he was in partnership with Robert C. Schenck. When Clement Vallandigham came to Dayton in 1847 and became actively engaged in the practice of law a few years later, he often availed himself of the superior facilities afforded by Judge Crane's extensive law library in preparation of his cases. Judge Crane mentored and encouraged the aspiring young attorney and a warm personal friendship developed between them that was never broken.

Joseph Halsey Crane died in Dayton, aged 69, and was interred in Woodland Cemetery, Dayton, Ohio.

== Sources ==
- United States Congress. "Joseph H. Crane (id: C000872)". Biographical Directory of the United States Congress.
- History of Union County, New Jersey from 1664 to 1923. New York: Lewis Historical Publishing Co., 1923, 1234 pgs.
- History of Dayton, Ohio. Dayton, Ohio: United Brethren Publishing House, 1889, 753 pgs.
- Edgar, John F Pioneer life in Dayton and vicinity from 1796 to 1840. Dayton, Ohio: W.J. Shuey, United Brethren Publishing House, 1896, 307 pgs.
- Gilkey, Elliot Howard. The Ohio hundred year book : a hand-book of the public men and public institutions of Ohio, from the formation of the North-west Territory (1787) to July 1, 1901. Columbus: F.J. Heer, state printer, 1901, 779 pgs.
- Hover, Barnes, Jones, Conover, Wright, Leiter, Bradfords, Culkins, eds. Memoirs of the Miami Valley, 3 vols, Chicago: Robert O. Law Company, 1919.

Ohio House of Representatives
Preceded by Philip Gunckel; Edmund Munger	Representative from Montgomery and Preble Counties; 1809–1810; Served alongside: David Purviance	Succeeded by David Hoover; George Newcome
U.S. House of Representatives
Preceded by William McLean	United States Representative from Ohio's 3rd congressional district 1829–1837	Succeeded by Patrick Gaines Goode
Legal offices
Preceded by Francis Dunlavy	President Judge of the Ohio Court of Common Pleas; 1st Judicial Circuit; 1817–1829	Succeeded by George B. Holt
