= Ichabod Crane (colonel) =

American military officer

Ichabod B. Crane
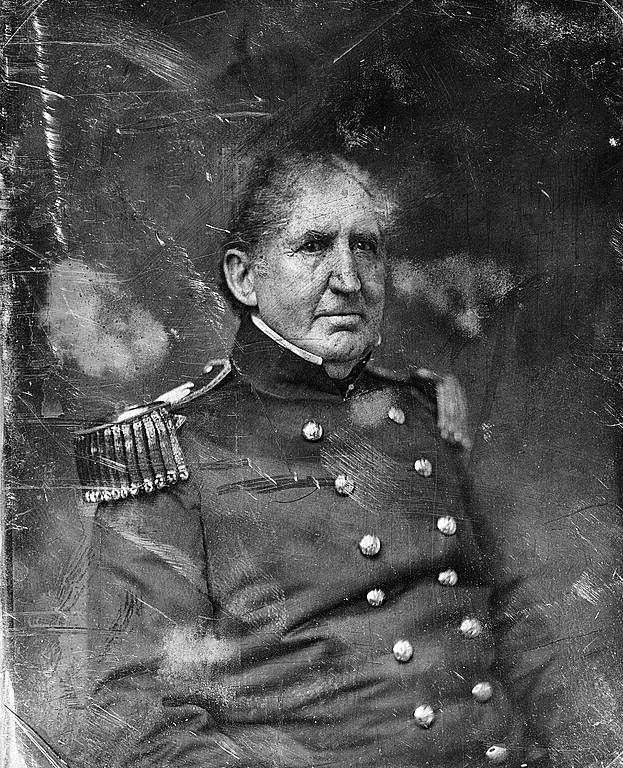
- Only known photo of Crane; an 1848 daguerreotype
- Born: July 18, 1787; Elizabethtown, New Jersey, U.S.
- Died: October 5, 1857 (aged 70)
- Burial place: New Springville, Staten Island, New York, U.S.
- Relatives: Stephen Crane (grandfather); William Montgomery Crane (brother); Joseph Halsey Crane (brother); Charles Henry Crane (son)
- Military career
- Allegiance: United States of America
- Branch: United States Marine Corps; United States Army
- Service years: 1809-1812 (USMC); 1812-1857 (USA)
- Rank: First lieutenant (USMC); Colonel (USA)
- Unit: USS United States (1809-1811)
- Commands: Company B, 3rd Artillery (1812-1825); Btln., 4th Artillery (1825-1832); 2nd Artillery; 1st Artillery
- Conflicts: War of 1812; Capture of Fort York (1813); Capture of Fort George (1813); Second Battle of Sacket's Harbor; Black Hawk War; Second Seminole War; "Patriot War"
- Other work: Commander, U.S. Army District of Northeast Florida (c. 1837); acting governor, Military Asylum, Washington DC (1851-1853); post commander, Governors Island

Ichabod Bennet Crane (July 18, 1787 – October 5, 1857) was an American military officer who served for 48 years, reaching the rank of colonel in the United States Army. He is the probable namesake of the protagonist in Washington Irving's The Legend of Sleepy Hollow.

== Early life and education ==
Crane was born in Elizabethtown (now Elizabeth), New Jersey. He was the son of general William Crane. He was a first cousin twice removed of Stephen Crane. He enlisted in the United States Marine Corps in 1809 and was commissioned as a second lieutenant, assigned to the USS United States, a 44-gun frigate commanded by Stephen Decatur. He served aboard the United States for two years. Crane resigned from the Marines in April 1812, to accept a commission in the United States Army as a captain in command of Company B, 3rd Artillery; the unit designation would later be Battery B, 1st Artillery (today's 2nd Battalion, 1st Air Defense Artillery).

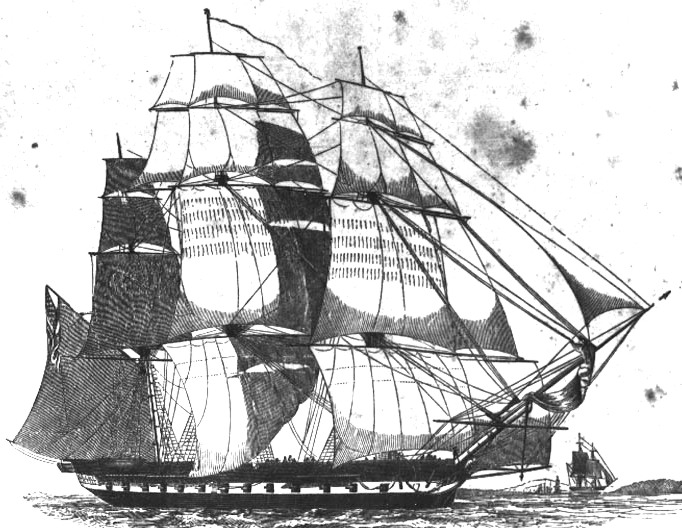
USS United States, the ship on which Ichabod served as a second lieutenant in the Marines (1809–1811)

== Career ==
During the War of 1812, Crane served on the Niagara Frontier. He was assigned command of an artillery battery at Fort Pike, which he helped construct, in Sackets Harbor, New York, and was involved with the capture on April 27, 1813, of Fort York, and at the end of May 1813 the capture of Fort George in Canada. While Crane and the Americans were capturing Fort George, a joint British-Canadian force attacked the American positions at Sacket's Harbor in the Second Battle of Sacket's Harbor.

Crane continued to serve in the Northern Department after the war. In 1820 his company was transferred to Fort Wolcott in Newport, Rhode Island where Crane served as the fort's commander. While stationed at Fort Wolcott, his son Charles was born.

In 1825 he was brevetted to major in the 4th Artillery and was transferred to Fort Monroe, Virginia. In 1832 Crane led five companies of troops from Fort Monroe in the Black Hawk War. He received a promotion to lieutenant colonel in the 2nd Artillery in November 1832, and was transferred to the Buffalo Barracks in Buffalo, New York. He commanded the 2nd Artillery unit in the Second Seminole War (1835–1842) and acted as Commander of the U.S. Army District of Northeast Florida, serving under Col. Zachary Taylor, who commanded the 1st Infantry Regiment. Ft. Crane, south of Rochelle in Alachua County, was named after Crane. Built in January 1837, the fort was commanded by Lt. John H. Winder. After service in Florida, Crane and his unit were transferred back to the Buffalo Barracks.

During the "Patriot War" in 1838, an insurrection against British rule in Canada, he was tasked with the responsibility of preventing U.S. involvement by preventing the smuggling of arms across the border. In mid-1843, he received his final promotion to colonel and was given command of the 1st Artillery.

Two companies of the 1st Artillery, Co. L and Co. M were assigned to Fort Umpqua in southwest Oregon. During a visit there, Crane employed a young Umpqua Indian named Juan as a personal valet. Juan died on December 27, 1856, on Staten Island, and is buried with Crane and his wife Charlotte.

Crane was stationed in Washington D.C. in 1851 and was given an additional assignment as acting governor of the Military Asylum at Washington, D.C., a position he held until November 1853. He also served as post commander of Governors Island, an island in New York Harbor approximately one-half mile south of lower Manhattan.

Crane and his wife Charlotte (May 25, 1798 – September 25, 1878) had a house built in the New Springville section of Staten Island, New York in 1853, while he was still on active duty. The house was located at 3525 Victory Blvd; it was demolished in the 1990s. The owner had offered it to Historic Richmond Town, on the condition they move it off its former site; it never transpired due to a lack of funding.

Crane died on October 5, 1857, while still on active duty, and is buried in Asbury Methodist Cemetery, in New Springville Staten Island, not far from his former home.

His grave marker bears the inscription:

He served his country faithfully 48 years and was much beloved and respected by all who knew him.

== Family ==
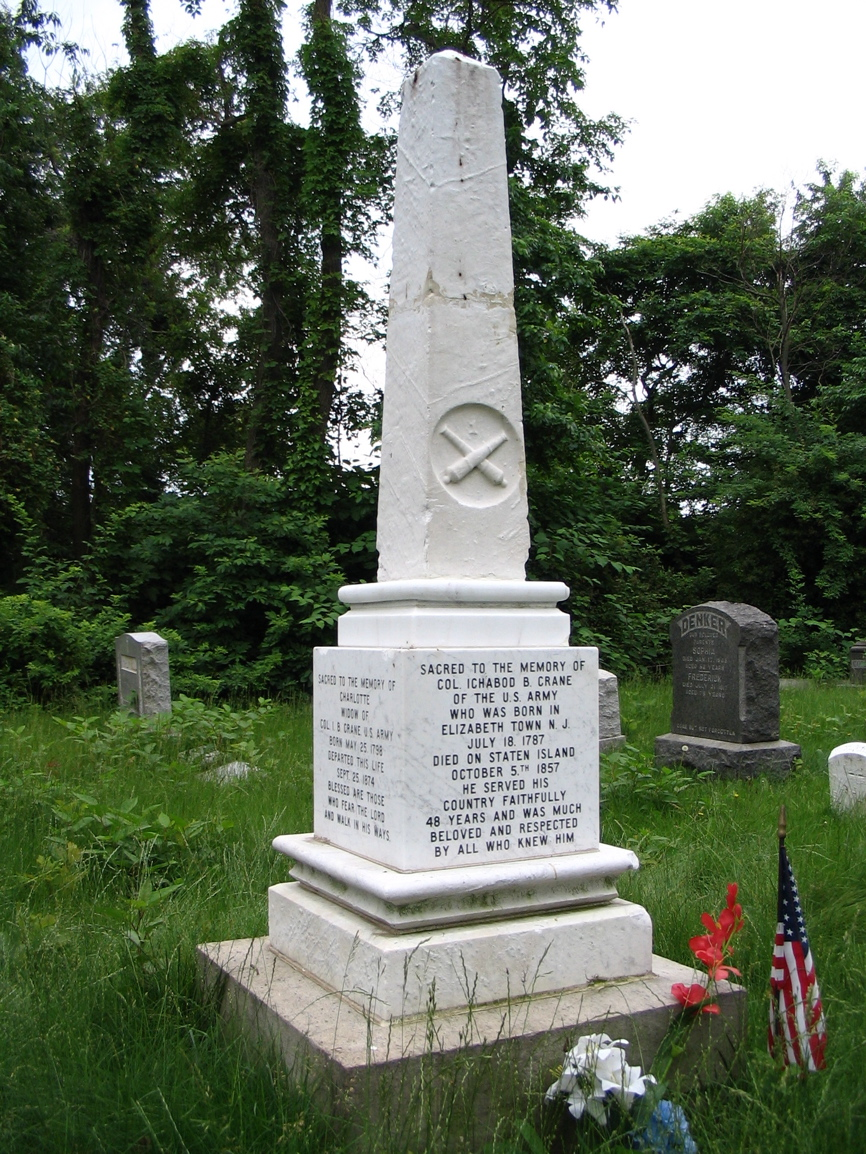
Col. Ichabod Crane's gravemarker

- Stephen Crane (1709 – July 1, 1780); grandfather, a delegate to the First Continental Congress. Bayoneted by Hessian troops passing through Elizabethtown on their way to Springfield on June 23, 1780, died of his wounds on July 1, 1780.
- Gen. William Crane, father; born 1748 in Elizabethtown, served as major of an Essex County, New Jersey regiment. Commissioned as a 1st lieutenant in the 4th New York Infantry Regiment in July 1775. Fought with Richard Montgomery in the Battle of Quebec, received a leg wound on November 2, 1775, that required amputation years later. Promoted to brigadier general in the New Jersey militia after the war.
- Abigail (Miller) Crane; mother
- Charlotte; wife (May 25, 1798 - September 25, 1874).
- William Montgomery Crane (February 1, 1776 - March 18, 1846) brother, naval officer, fought in War of 1812, born in Elizabethtown died in Washington. Middle name in honor of Richard Montgomery.
- Joseph Halsey Crane, brother; Ohio congressman.
- Mariah Crane, sister
- Joanna Crane (died about 1818), sister; married John Magie.
- Phoebe Crane, sister
- Charles Henry Crane (19 July 1825 - October 10, 1883) son; rose through the ranks to become a Brigadier General and Surgeon General of the United States Army (1882–1883). He was one of the attending physicians of Abraham Lincoln after he was shot.
- Eliza Crane, daughter, disappeared on July 20, 1858, after taking a ferry from Staten Island to Manhattan. Her husband Captain (future Brevet Major General) John M. Brannan was in command of the Department of Key West in Florida assigned to Fort Zachary Taylor. She had been living at the fort with her husband but went to Staten Island to stay with her mother due to illness.

== Legacy ==
=== Sleepy Hollow ===
The main character of Washington Irving's The Legend of Sleepy Hollow is named Ichabod Crane. While Washington Irving did not expressly admit that the character is named after Colonel Crane, the two men had met in 1814 at Fort Pike located on Lake Ontario in Sackets Harbor, New York. Irving was an aide-de-camp to New York Gov. Daniel D. Tompkins, who was inspecting defenses in the Sackets Harbor area. Crane's somewhat unusual and memorable first name Ichabod comes from the biblical figure of that name, the son of Phinehas and grandson of Eli the High Priest.

== Bibliography ==
As we were: the story of old Elizabethtown Volume 13 of Collections of the New Jersey Historical Society New Jersey Historical Society Collections Author Theodore Thayer Publisher Published for the New Jersey Historical Society by the Grassmann Pub. Co., 1964 Original from the University of Michigan Digitized September 22, 2008
