= Doris Crane =

British artist

- Born: 20 February 1911 – 16 March 1999; Clapham, London, England
- Died: 16 March 1999 (aged 88)
- Known for: Sculpture

Doris Martha Alice Crane (20 February 1911 – 16 March 1999) was a British sculptor who created figures and reliefs in both ivory and wood.

== Biography ==
Crane was born in the Clapham area of London and studied under Willian Everatt Gray. She was a regular exhibitor at the Royal Academy in London, at the Royal Scottish Academy and at the Paris Salon. Crane became a member of the Royal Miniature Society in 1958. She was a member of the Deben Art Club and lived for many years at Old Felixstowe in Suffolk.
