= Mary Helen Peck Crane =

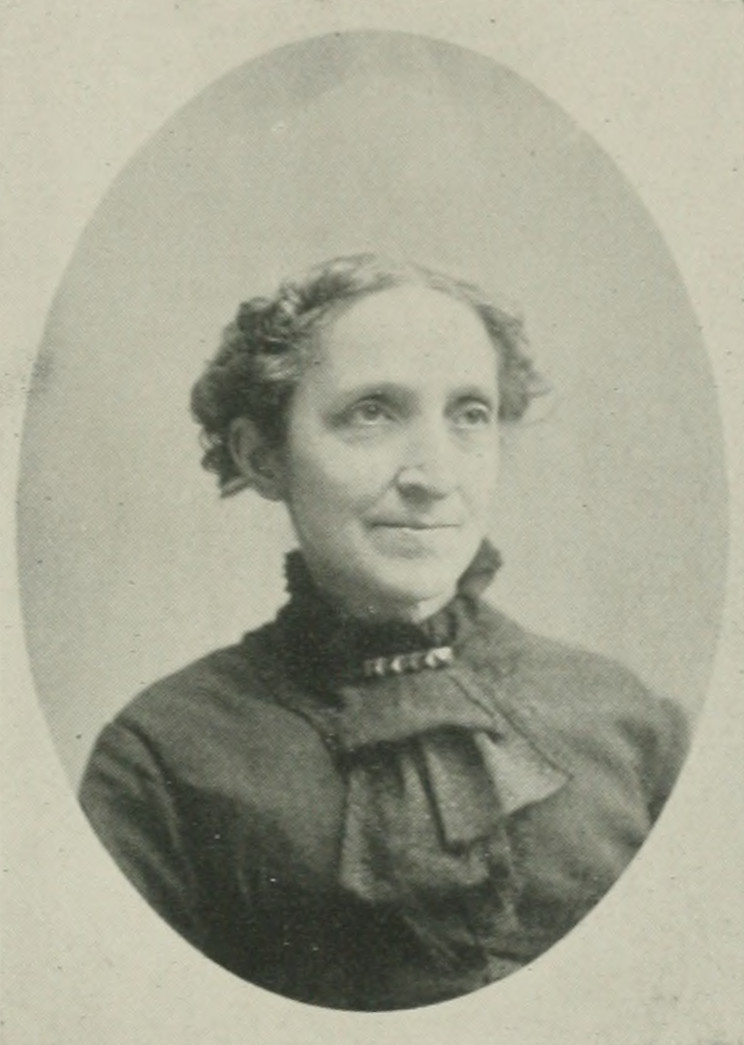
- Photo in A Woman of the Century
- Born: Mary Helen Peck; April 10, 1827; Wilkes-Barre, Pennsylvania, U.S.
- Died: December 7, 1891 (aged 64); Paterson, New Jersey, U.S.
- Resting place: Evergreen Cemetery, Hillside, New Jersey, U.S.
- Education: Wyoming Seminary; Rutgers Female Institute
- Occupations: Church and temperance worker; writer
- Spouse: Jonathan Townley Crane (m. 1848; died 1880)
- Children: 14, including Stephen Crane, William Howe Crane
- Parent: George Peck
- Relatives: Jesse Truesdell Peck (uncle)
- Writing career
- Language: English
- Literary movement: temperance

Mary Helen Peck Crane (née, Peck; April 10, 1827 – December 7, 1891) was a 19th-century American church and temperance activist, as well as a writer. She served as the State superintendent of press for New Jersey Woman's Christian Temperance Union (WCTU). She was the mother of the writer, Stephen Crane.

== Early life and education ==
Mary Helen Peck was born in Wilkes-Barre, Pennsylvania, April 10, 1827. She was the only daughter of Rev. George Peck, D. D., of the Methodist Episcopal Church, the author and editor; and the niece of Bishop Jesse Truesdell Peck.

During the three years that her father was principal of the Wyoming Seminary, she attended the classes suitable to her age. On his removal to New York City in 1840, she became a student of Rutgers Female Institute in that city, where she spent three years. (Note: According to Wertheim (1997), she graduated from Rutgers Female Institute in 1847.)

== Career ==
January 18, 1848, in New York City, she married Rev. Jonathan Townley Crane, D. D. (died 1880, Port Jervis, New York), of the Methodist Episcopal Church, Newark Conference. They had fourteen children: Mary Helen, George Peck, Jonathan Townley, William Howe, Agnes Elizabeth, Edmund Bryan, Wilber Fiske, Elizabeth Townley, Luther Peck, Myra Blanche, Blanche, Jesse T., Jesse T., and Stephen. She was a devoted wife and mother, assisting her husband in his work in the church and among the poor.

For several years, she was a class leader in St. Paul's Methodist Episcopal Church, Newark, New Jersey, in which she did much toward the character development of the youth in her class. In 1872, she was appointed Corresponding Secretary for New Jersey by the New York branch of the Woman's Foreign Missionary Society of the Methodist Episcopal Church, and later served as Recording Secretary of the board of managers of that body. During Crane's term of service as corresponding secretary of this society, she was active and successful in forming local societies in aid of the cause. The General Conference of 1872 constituted her a member of the board of managers of the Ladies and Pastors' Christian Union, and the Newark Annual Conference of 1875 made her Corresponding Secretary of the Conference Society.

For some years, she was deeply interested in the temperance cause, speaking and writing in favor of its advancement. As her children grew up, she devoted much time to the work of the WCTU. Crane delivered addresses on several occasions before the members of the New Jersey Legislature, when temperance bills were pending, and she greatly aided the men who were fighting to secure good laws. The National WCTU, which met in Cincinnati in 1875, constituted her vice-president for New Jersey.

As the pioneer of press work by women at the Ocean Grove Camp Meeting, she did valuable work, including reports for the New-York Tribune and the New York Associated Press, during the last ten years of the religious and temperance gatherings at the Ocean Grove Camp Meeting. For about ten years, she was the State superintendent of press for the New Jersey of WCTU. She wrote several leaflets that were of great value to the press-workers of the local unions.

== Personal life ==
For over a half-century Crane was an active member of the Methodist Episcopal Church. She died December 7, 1891, in Paterson, New Jersey, after a short illness contracted at the National WCTU convention in Boston.

She was taken ill in Boston at the National Convention of the WCTU, from which she went by her own choice to be treated in the Paterson Hospital, where she died. Her funeral was held in Market Street Church of that city, and her remains were laid to rest beside those of her husband in Evergreen Cemetery, Hillside, New Jersey One daughter and six sons survived her. Some of her writings are contained in the Syracuse University Special Collections, Schoberlin collection.
