= Robert Dickson Crane =

American presidential advisor (1929–2021)

- Born: March 26, 1929; Cambridge, Massachusetts, US
- Died: December 12, 2021 (aged 92)
- Other name: Farooq Abdul Haq
- Education: Harvard University; Ludwig-Maximilians-Universität München; Northwestern University (B.A); Harvard Law School (J.D)
- Occupations: Activist; author; public servant
- Known for: Muslim activism

Robert Dickson Crane (March 26, 1929 – December 12, 2021) was an American activist. He was an adviser to President Richard Nixon and was the deputy director for planning of the United States National Security Council. He authored or co-authored more than a dozen books and over 50 professional articles on comparative legal systems, global strategy, and information management.

== Early life and education ==
Crane was born in Cambridge, Massachusetts. In 1945, at the age of 16, he entered Harvard University to study Russian as the first step in becoming an international journalist. In 1948, he became the first American permitted to study at a university in Occupied Germany, having been accepted at the Ludwig-Maximilians-Universität München. While in Germany, he studied the sociology of religion and prepared a book on totalitarian regimes and on the spiritual dynamics of resistance movements against such regimes.

Upon his return to the United States, Dr. Crane got his B.A. from Northwestern University, Evanston, Illinois, in 1956, summa cum laude, and his J.D. from Harvard Law School, Cambridge, MA. His thesis was titled "The Accommodation of Ethics in International Commercial Arbitration" and was published in the Arbitration Journal, Fall 1959. At Harvard, he also founded the Harvard International Law Journal and acted as the first president of the Harvard International Law Society.

Dr. Crane was admitted to the District of Columbia Bar in 1960.

== Political career ==
In 1962, Crane became one of the four co-founders of the first Washington-based foreign-policy think-tank, the Center for Strategic and International Studies (CSIS). In 1966, he left to become Director of Third World Studies at the first professional futures forecasting center, The Hudson Institute, led by Herman Kahn.

From the time of the Cuban Missile Crisis in 1962 until the beginning of Richard Nixon's victorious campaign for the presidency in 1967, Crane was his principal foreign policy adviser, responsible for preparing a "reader's digest" of professional articles for Nixon on the key foreign policy issues. During the campaign, Crane collected his position papers into a book, Inescapable Rendezvous: New Directions for American Foreign Policy, with a foreword by Congressman Gerald Ford, who succeeded Nixon as president.

On January 20, 1969, Crane moved into the White House as deputy director (for Planning) of the National Security Council, but soon moved to the U.S. Department of State as special assistant to Deputy Secretary Elliot Richardson, responsible for liaison with the National Security Council and then as Director of the Office of Resources policy responsible for monitoring the policies and budgets of the U.S. government's intelligence agencies.

In 1974, he left the government to become executive director of the American Indian National Bank and President of its investment advisory firm, The Native American Economic Development Corporation. In 1975, he founded his own consulting firm by the same name to staff the U.S. Treasury Department's U.S.-Saudi Joint Commission for Economic Cooperation, where he produced his book, Planning the Future of Saudi Arabia. In 1976, at the request of the U.S. State Department, he served for a year as the Principal Economic and Budget Advisor to the Finance Minister in the Emirate of Bahrain to prepare a five-year plan based on this book.

In September 1981, President Ronald Reagan appointed Crane to be U.S. ambassador to the United Arab Emirates to pursue two-track diplomacy by developing relations with the various Islamist movements in the Middle East and North Africa. Crane continued in a minor way to advise President Reagan on foreign policies and together with Norman Kurland was one of the two principal founders of President Reagan's Presidential Task Force on Economic Justice, in which Crane served as Chairman of the Financial Markets Committee.

== Muslim activism ==
Crane converted to Islam in 1980. Since the early 1980s, Crane worked full-time as a Muslim activist. From 1983 to 1986, he was the Director of Da'wa at the Islamic Center of Washington on Massachusetts Avenue. In 1986, he joined the International Institute of Islamic Thought as its Director of Publications, and then helped to found the American Muslim Council, now defunct, serving as Director of its Legal Division from 1992 to 1994. In this capacity, he was the founding President of the Muslim American Bar Association.

In 1994, Crane founded his Center for Civilizational Renewal in Santa Fe, New Mexico, where he produced his book, Shaping the Future: Challenge and Response. In 1996, he founded the Center for Public Policy Research located in Springfield, Virginia, with Ahmed Yousef's United Association for Studies and Research and served until 2001 as managing director of its scholarly Middle East Affairs Journal. He then published as head of his Islamic Institute for Strategic Studies and as Senior Research Fellow at the International Institute of Islamic Thought.

In 2011, he was recruited by the "world's largest think-tank", the Qatar Foundation in the State of Qatar, to teach a course on "How Policy is Made in Washington". When he arrived on January 1, 2012, he was reassigned to be a full professor and Director of a new research center in the Qatar Faculty of Islamic Studies, entitled the Center for the Study of Islamic Thought and Muslim Societies, charged with studying the origins, state of the art, and future scenarios for the so-called Arab Spring.

On January 1, 2014, Crane was appointed professor emeritus for 18 months to complete his four-volume textbook, Islam and Muslims: Essence and Practice, as a model and part of a proposal for a Holistic Education Center to produce edited textbooks on Christianity, Judaism, Buddhism, Confucianism, and Indigenous Religions by spiritual scholars in these world religions.

== Publications ==
Crane has co-authored more than a dozen books, including:

- Détente: Cold War Strategies in Transition, Dulles and Crane, CSIS, Praeger, 1965
- Planning the Future of Saudi Arabia: A Model for Achieving National Priorities, Praeger, 1978
- Shaping the Future: Challenge and Response, Tapestry, 1997.

These books have been augmented by numerous monographs, including the following produced under the Islamic Institute for Strategic Studies before the September 11, 2001 attacks:

- Meta-law: An Islamic Policy Paradigm, 49 pages
- The Grand Strategy of Justice, 83 pages
- Kosovo and Chechnya: Products of the Past, Harbingers of the Future, 32 pages
- The Role of Religion in America, 24 pages
- The Muslim Challenge in America and the World, 35 pages

As a scholar honored in the annual publication, the Muslim500 most influential Muslims in the world, he also contributes an annual "state of the world" essay, including the following:

2012 - U.S. Foreign Policy in the Muslim World, Justice as Grand Strategy: The Missing Dimension in American Foreign Policy Toward the Muslim World.

2013-2014 - Flameout of the Muslim Brotherhood: Options for the Future.

2014-2015 - Holistic Education and the Challenges of Interfaith Cooperation.

2016 - Kurdistan: Pivot of West Asia?
