= The Voyage (short story) =

1921 short story by Katherine Mansfield

"The Voyage" is a 1921 short story by Katherine Mansfield. It was first published in The Sphere on 24 December 1921, and later reprinted in The Garden Party and Other Stories.

== Plot summary ==
At the harbour Fenella and her grandmother say goodbye to Fenella's father and board the Picton boat; a number of everyday situations are described during the journey, which highlight a degree of tension between the rather religious grandmother and staff on the boat. At Picton they are met by Mr Penreddy with a carriage. They arrive at the grandparents’ house and meet Fenella's grandfather. It becomes apparent slowly as the story develops that Fenella's mother has recently died, and she is being taken to live in Picton for an unknown length of time.

== Characters ==
- Fenella
- Frank, Fenella's father
- Mrs Mary Crane, Fenella's grandmother
- The stewardess
- Mr Penreddy
- Mr Walter Crane, the grandfather

== Major themes ==
- Death (Fenella's mother)
- Sacrificing (Fenella's father)
- Travelling (Fenella and her grandmother)
- Awakening (Fenella learns to put the past behind as the story progresses)

== Literary significance ==
The text is written in the modernist mode, without a set structure, and with many shifts in the narrative.

=== New Zealand setting ===
While many of Mansfield's works are set in either Europe or are non-specific in their setting, 'The Voyage' 's topographical (and aquatic) references relate to the New Zealand of her birth and upbringing.
