= H. Richard Crane =

American physicist (1907–2007)

Horace Richard Crane
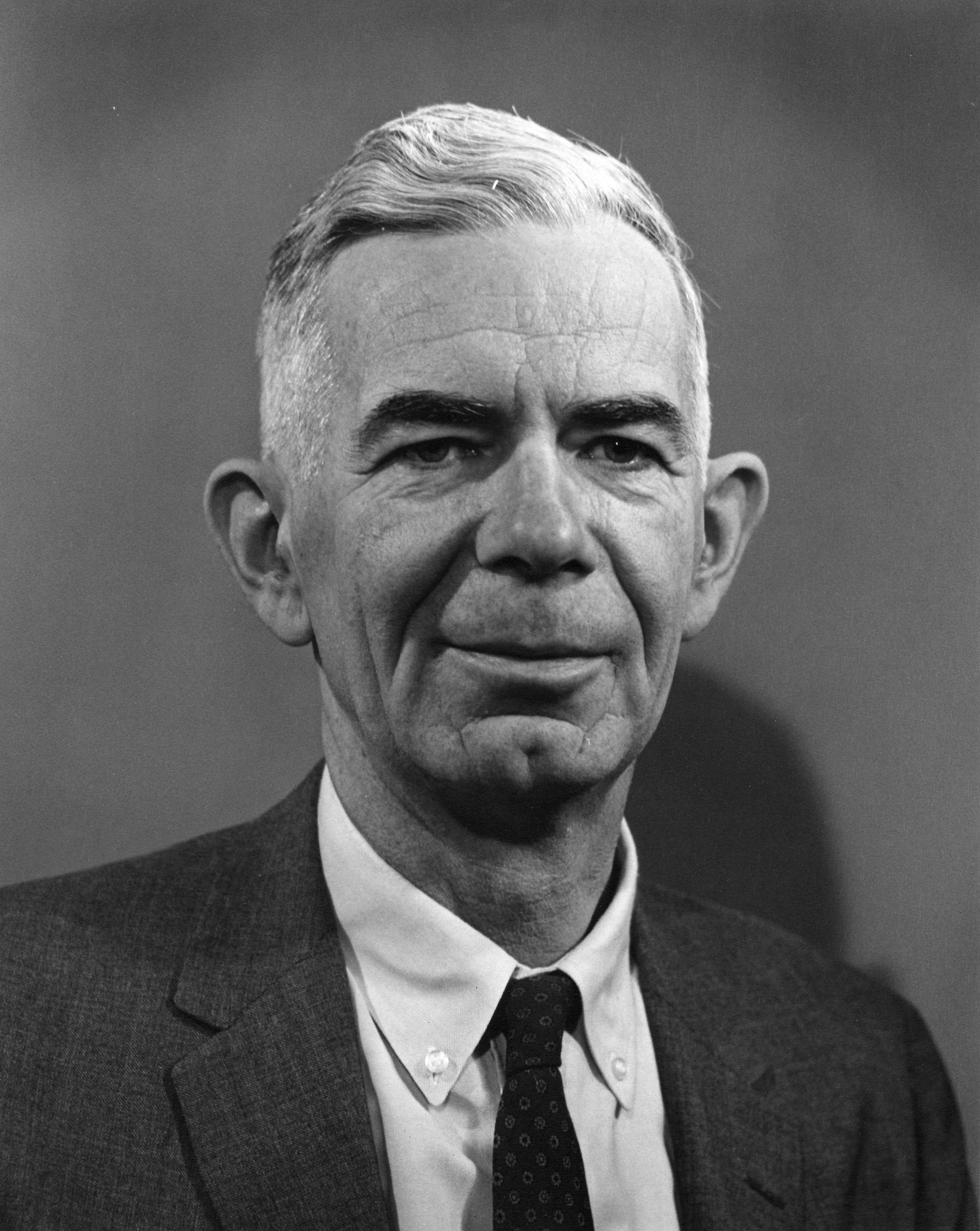
- Crane in c. 1975
- Born: November 4, 1907; Turlock, California
- Died: April 19, 2007 (aged 99); Chelsea, Michigan
- Education: Caltech (BS, Ph.D.)
- Known for: Race-track synchrotron
- Awards: Davisson–Germer Prize (1967); National Medal of Science (1986); Oersted Medal (1976)
- Scientific career
- Fields: Atomic physics
- Workplaces: Caltech (1934–1935); University of Michigan (1935–2007); MIT Radiation Laboratory (1940–1941)
- Thesis: "Artificial Radioactivity" (May 19, 1934)
- Doctoral advisor: Charles Lauritsen

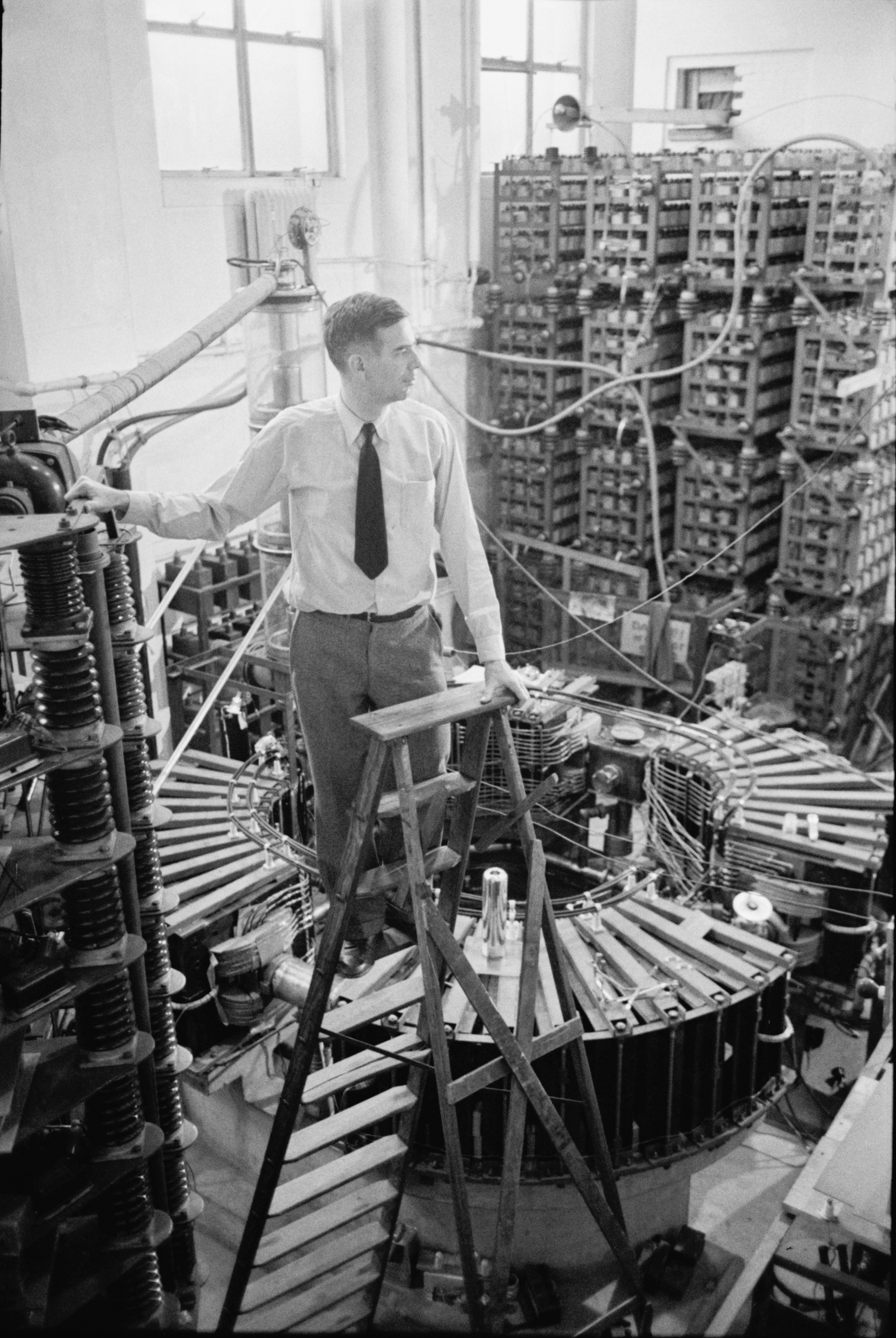
Crane with an early synchrotron at the University of Michigan, 1949

Horace Richard Crane (November 4, 1907 – April 19, 2007) was an American physicist, the inventor of the Race Track Synchrotron, a recipient of President Ronald Reagan's National Medal of Science "for the first measurement of the magnetic moment and spin of free electrons and positrons".

He was also noted for proving the existence of neutrinos. The National Academy of Sciences called Crane "an extraordinary physicist". The University of Michigan called him "one of the most distinguished experimental physicists of the 20th century". Crane was a chairman of the Department of Physics and a professor of physics at the University of Michigan, a member of the National Academy of Sciences.

Crane earned his Ph.D. in 1934 under Charles Lauritsen at Caltech. During World War II, he worked on radar at MIT and proximity fuses at the Carnegie Institution of Washington and the University of Michigan. He consulted for the National Defense Research Commission and the Office of Scientific Research and Development.

From 1957 to 1960, Crane was president of the Midwestern Universities Research Association. In addition, he was president of the American Association of Physics Teachers in 1965, and on the board of governors of the American Institute of Physics from 1964 to 1975.

Crane was a supporter of higher education all his life. He and his wife donated money and time to Washtenaw Community College, in Ann Arbor Township, Michigan, with a building being named after them. Their effort was to encourage making higher education accessible to all the residents in the county, and their efforts are documented on the campus itself.

== Life and career ==
- 1907: Born in Turlock, California on November 4
- 1930: BS, California Institute of Technology
- 1934: PhD in physics, California Institute of Technology
- 1934–1935: California Institute of Technology, Research Fellow in Physics
- 1935–1938: University of Michigan, Instructor and Research Physicist
- 1938–1946: University of Michigan, Assistant Professor to Associate Professor of Physics
- 1946–1978: University of Michigan, Professor of Physics
- 1978–2007: University of Michigan, Emeritus Professor of Physics

== See also ==
- List of nominees for the Nobel Prize in Physics
