= William M. Crane =

American commodore (1776–1846)

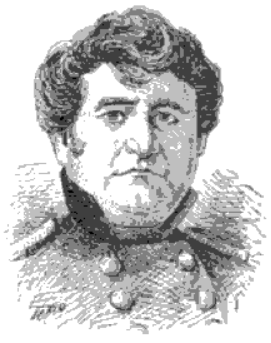
- Born: February 1, 1776; Elizabethtown, New Jersey
- Died: March 18, 1846 (aged 70); Washington, D.C.
- Occupation: Naval officer

William Montgomery Crane (February 1, 1776 – March 18, 1846) was an American naval officer. A commodore in the United States Navy, he served during the First Barbary War and the War of 1812. He was the son of General William Crane who was wounded at the Battle of Quebec while serving under Richard Montgomery in honor of whom he was given the middle name of Montgomery. His brother was Colonel Ichabod Crane who also served in the War of 1812 as well as the Mexican War.

== Biography ==
Crane was born at Elizabethtown, New Jersey on February 1, 1776, and appointed midshipman in 1799. Serving as a lieutenant on the USS Vixen he won honors for his gallant fighting in the attacks on Tripoli in 1804.

He was in command of the brigantine USS Nautilus on 29 July 1812, when it was captured by a British squadron, according to the then Lieutenant Crane;

the chaseing ship put her helm up hoisted a broad pendant and English colours and ranged under my lee quarter--unable to resist I was compelled to strike the Flag of the United States.

Crane was promoted to master commandant on March 4, 1813, and to captain on November 22, 1814. He was assigned command of the Mediterranean Squadron in 1827 and acted as one of the commissioners in the negotiations with the Ottoman Empire.

He was on the Board of Navy Commissioners and the first Chief of the Bureau of Ordnance and Hydrography from 1842 until his death by suicide at the age of 70 years on March 18, 1846.

== Legacy ==
The Naval Ammunition Depot in Burns City, Indiana was renamed US Naval Ammunition Depot, Crane, in honor of Commodore Crane. The depot is currently named Naval Surface Warfare Center Crane Division. USS Crane (DD-109) was also named in his honor. The town of Crane, Indiana was named for him.
