= Ed Crane (journalist) =

American journalist

Ed Crane has been reporting on radio and television since 1979. He has been an anchor for the CBS radio and television networks and was also an anchor for the network's AM flagship in New York City, WCBS.

== Career ==
Crane graduated from Northwestern University. He started his career in 1979, working at WIFR-TV in Rockford, Illinois. In 1982, after working for WBBM in Chicago, he joined the CBS Radio Network where, for 18 years, he presented hourly newscasts as well as the World News Roundup and special reports. He went on to be a reporter and presenter for MarketWatch in the early 2000s and occasionally presented the CBS News TV broadcast Up to the Minute. Crane has also reported for WCBS-TV in New York City, and anchored for WCBS-AM, New York.

He is a recipient of the Chicago Headline Club Award. Crane's rich journalistic background is complemented by some interesting acting credits, including the role of Newscaster #6 in the 2004 remake of The Manchurian Candidate with Denzel Washington, and Interviewer in the 2006 movie The Hoax, starring Richard Gere.

Crane is an avid golfer and a wine enthusiast. On February 11, 2008, he relocated from Long Island, New York, to Sacramento - being joined by his wife Barbara and his son P.J. - to broadcast the morning news on the highly rated NewsTalk 1530KFBK.

As of 2015 Ed Crane is working as a political consultant and is the co founder with Patrick Dorinson of thelibertyplaybook.com and President of California-based Ed Crane Media
