= William Howe Crane =

American lawyer

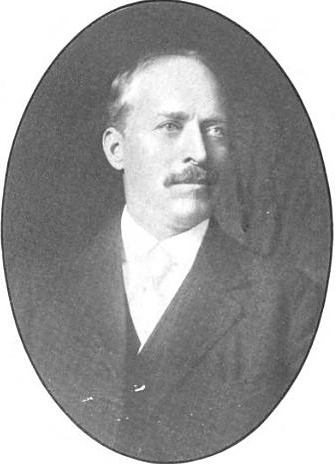
Portrait of Crane from A Scientific Currency (1910)

William Howe Crane (1854–1926) was an American lawyer. Born to Reverend Jonathan Townley Crane and Mary Helen Peck Crane, he was the fourth-oldest of nine surviving children—Mary Helen, George Peck, Jonathan Townley, William Howe, Agnes Elizabeth, Edmund Byran, Wilbur Fiske, Luther and Stephen. In 1880 he graduated from Albany Law School, after which he established a practice in Port Jervis, New York. Crane was a prominent member of the community; he served as district clerk of the board of education and treasurer of the town's waterworks. One year he served as special judge for Orange County, which earned him the nickname "Judge" Crane. He was also the author of one book, A Scientific Currency (1910).

His youngest brother was the author Stephen Crane (1871–1900), who was a frequent visitor to his home in Port Jervis. Stephen based some of his Sullivan County Tales and Sketches on his older brother's nearby hunting and fishing preserve, the Hartwood Club, which he visited often. In 1892, William was witness to the lynching of African American Robert Lewis in Port Jervis; he was one of the few men who attempted to intervene. He gave testimony at the resulting inquest, during which he recounted his vain attempts to free Lewis from the noose. Stephen Crane's 1898 novella The Monster, takes place in a fictional counterpart to Port Jervis, and has similarities to Lewis' lynching.

William regularly sent his younger brother funds while Stephen was living in England during the last few years of his life, and after the author's death at the age of 28, William became the executor of his will. He later retired to California. His Port Jervis home on East Main Street—now known as the William Howe Crane Homestead—is the home of a local law firm.

He is buried in the Oceanside Cemetery in Oceanside, California.
