= David Crane (politics) =

American academic (born 1953)

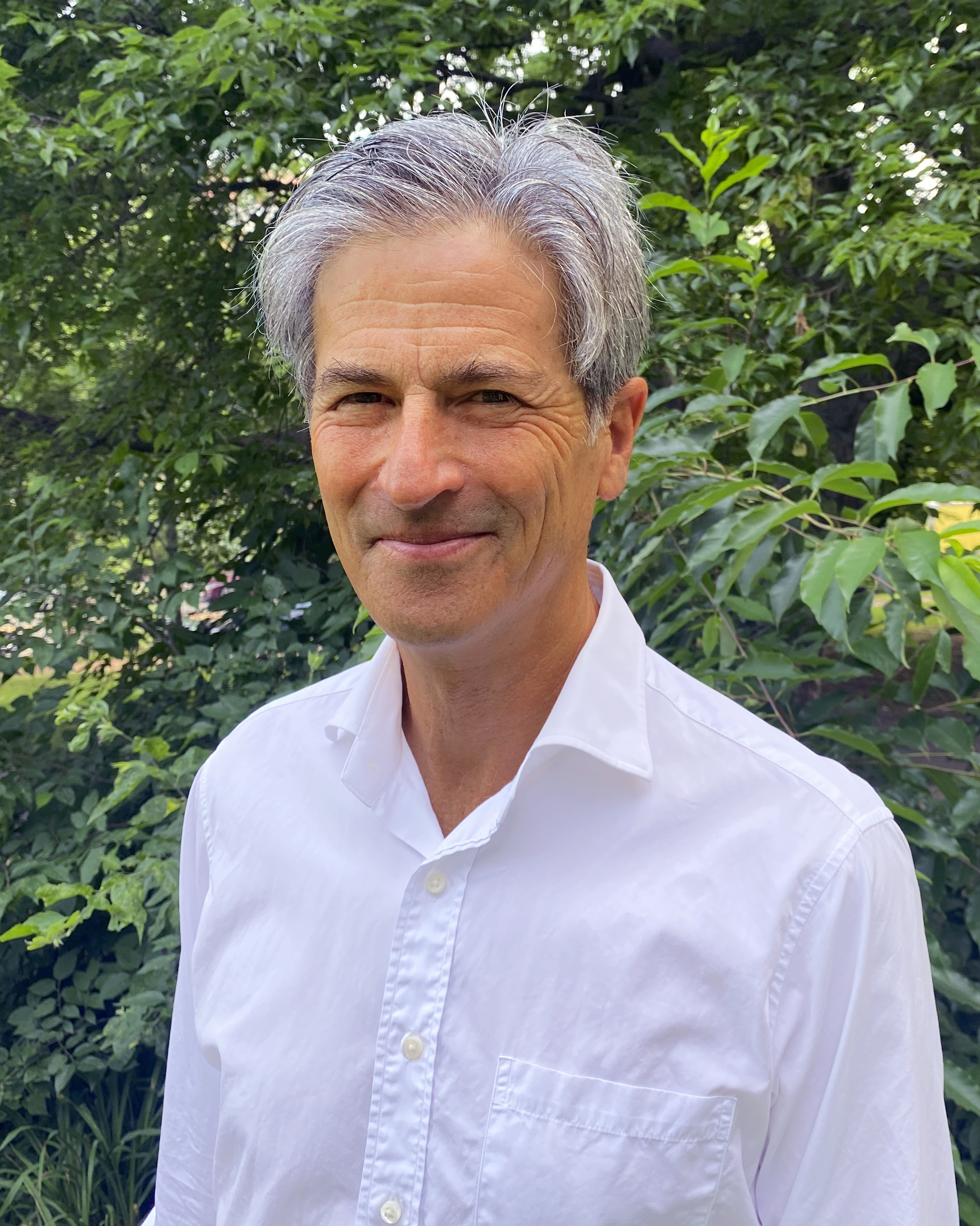
- Born: December 24, 1953 (age 72); Denver, Colorado, U.S.
- Education: University of Michigan, Ann; Arbor; University of California, Hastings
- Political party: Democratic

David Crane is a lecturer in public policy at Stanford University and is the co-founder and president of Govern for California, a non-profit organization seeking to counter special interest influence in the California state legislature.

== History ==
From 2004 to 2010 he served as a special advisor to Governor Arnold Schwarzenegger, and from 1979 to 2003 he was a partner at Babcock & Brown, a financial services company. Formerly, he served on the University of California Board of Regents and as a director of the California State Teachers' Retirement System, California High-Speed Rail Authority, California Economic Development Commission, Djerassi Resident Artists Program, Environmental Defense Fund, Legal Services for Children, Jewish Community Center of San Francisco, Society of Actuaries Blue Ribbon Panel on the Causes of Public Pension Underfunding, and Volcker-Ravitch Task Force on the State Budget Crisis.

== Govern for California ==
Crane is a registered Democrat, and has written extensively on the subjects of government accounting, pension funding, government finance and investment policies, political reform, and state governance. In 2011 he co-founded Govern for California (GFC) with the goal of empowering state legislators to govern in the general interest and be less influenced by special interest groups when crafting legislation. Since 2019 GFC consistently ranks as the largest bundler of direct donations to state legislators when compared with other interest groups. GFC consists of a network of 17 independently governed chapters (PACs) that make political donations. GFC has also championed good-governance bills such as AB 890 to enable nurse practitioners to practice independently, blocked bills such as AB 221 to ban Teach For America educators from working in charter and public schools, and successfully led the opposition to Proposition 30 in 2022 which would have increased California state taxes on personal income above $2 million to fund electric vehicle subsidies and wildfire prevention.
