= Frank Crane (clergyman and writer) =

Frank Crane

Frank Crane (1861–1928) was an American clergyman and popular writer. Having been ordained in the Methodist Episcopal Church in 1882, and served as a pastor for more than 25 years, from 1909 he wrote syndicated newspaper columns and books of reflections and advice.

He was born on May 12, 1861, in Urbana, Illinois. His father, James Lyons Crane, was a Methodist minister who became the chaplain of 21st Illinois Infantry Regiment. Its colonel, Ulysses S. Grant, made him the postmaster of Springfield, Illinois in 1869 and the young Crane helped his father in the post office.

In 1921, the Boston Globe published a column of his writing, titled Just for Today. This writing contained 10 resolutions, with the suggestion to repeat them every morning, just for that day. Nowadays, these “Just for Todays” are widely used in Twelve-step programs like Alcoholics Anonymous, Al-Anon and Emotions Anonymous, in modified form.

In later life, he suffered from diabetes and died in Nice in France from a Intracerebral hemorrhage on November 5, 1928.
