= Bob Crane (cricketer) =

Australian cricketer (1942–2013)

Personal information
- Full name: Frederick Robert Crane
- Born: 10 July 1942; Mullumbimby, New South Wales, Australia
- Died: 6 April 2013 (aged 70); Brisbane, Queensland, Australia
- Batting: Left-handed
- Bowling: Right-arm off-spin
- Role: All-rounder

Domestic team information
- Years: Team
- 1965-66 to 1967-68: Queensland

Career statistics
Competition	First-class
Matches	23
Runs scored	995
Batting average	24.26
100s/50s	0/7
Top score	98
Balls bowled	2856
Wickets	32
Bowling average	40.12
5 wickets in innings	1
10 wickets in match	0
Best bowling	5/42
Catches/stumpings	35/–
- Source: Cricinfo, 17 January 2020

Frederick Robert Crane (10 July 1942 – 6 April 2013) was a cricketer who played first-class cricket for Queensland from 1965 to 1968.

Bob Crane was born in Mullumbimby in northern New South Wales and educated at Lismore High School before going to the University of Queensland to study engineering. A left-handed batsman, right-arm off-spin bowler and exceptional slips fieldsman, he played for the University team in the Brisbane Grade Cricket competition for 16 years, captaining the side for three seasons.

Crane played three seasons of Sheffield Shield cricket with Queensland. He made his highest score in his first match, when he was the only Queensland batsman to resist the New South Wales spin bowlers in the second innings, making 98 out of the team's total of 178. His best bowling figures were 5 for 42 against South Australia in 1967-68, when he also opened the batting and made 60 (Queensland's top score for the match) and 25.

Crane worked as a consulting engineer, mostly in Queensland. He died in Brisbane of pancreatic cancer aged 70.
