= Bill Crane =

Australian rules footballer

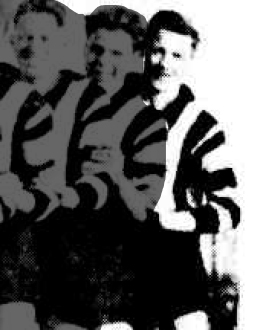
- Crane (right) in 1943

Personal information
- Full name: Bill Crane
- Born: 11 January 1924
- Died: 2 October 2014 (aged 90)
- Original team: Williamstown / Abbotsford
- Height: 173 cm (5 ft 8 in)
- Weight: 82 kg (181 lb)

Playing career^{1}
Years	Club	Games (Goals)
1943	Collingwood	4 (0)
- ^{1} Playing statistics correct to the end of 1943.

Bill Crane (11 January 1924 – 2 October 2014) was an Australian rules footballer who played with Collingwood in the Victorian Football League (VFL).

== Career ==
Before playing for the VFL Magpies, Crane played for Abbotsford and came with Des Fothergill to Williamstown in the VFA in 1941 as a 17yo and made two appearances for the Seagulls without kicking a goal before the recess for the Second World War intervened in his career. He went to Footscray in 1942 but failed to play a senior game before arriving at Collingwood in 1943.
