= David Crane (historian) =

Scottish historian and author

- Born: Scotland
- Education: University of Oxford
- Occupations: Historian, author

David Crane is a Scottish historian and author.

Crane read history and English at University of Oxford before becoming a lecturer at universities in the Netherlands, Japan, and Africa. He lives in northwest Scotland.

He has written two books about Lord Byron and his family; a biography of explorer Robert Falcon Scott; and a book about World War I grave monuments. He has also written a book about The Battle of Waterloo called Went the Day Well? (Witnessing Waterloo).

== Awards and honours ==
- 2013 Samuel Johnson Prize shortlist for Empires of the Dead
- 2013 Hessell-Tiltman Prize shortlist for Empires of the Dead

== Bibliography ==
- Lord Byron's Jackal: A Life of Trelawny (1999)
- The Kindness of Sisters: Annabella Milbanke and the Destruction of the Byrons (2002), held in 390 libraries according to WorldCat
- Scott of the Antarctic: A Life of Courage and Tragedy in the Extreme South (2006)
- Empires of the Dead: How One Man's Vision led to the Creation of WWI's World Graves (2013)
- Went the Day Well? (Witnessing Waterloo) (2015)
