= Stephen Crane bibliography =

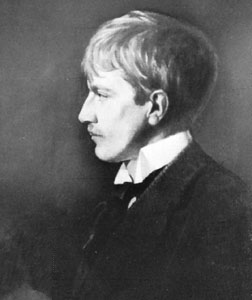
Detail taken from an 1894 portrait of Crane by Corwin Knapp Linson

The following is a list of works by American author Stephen Crane.

== Novels ==
- —. Maggie: A Girl of the Streets. New York: [printer unknown], 1893.
- —. The Red Badge of Courage. New York: D. Appleton & Company, 1895.
- —. George's Mother. New York: Edward Arnold, 1896.
- —. The Third Violet. New York: D. Appleton and Company, 1897.
- —. Active Service. New York: Frederick A. Stokes Company, 1899.
- Crane, Stephen and Robert Barr. The O'Ruddy. New York: Frederick A. Stokes Company, 1903.

== Short story collections ==
- —. The Little Regiment and Other Episodes from the American Civil War. New York: Appleton, 1896.
- —. The Open Boat and Other Tales of Adventure. New York: Doubleday & McClure, 1898.
- —. The Monster and Other Stories. New York: Harper & Brothers Publishers, 1899. (Contains only The Monster, "The Blue Hotel", and "His New Mittens".)
- —. Whilomville Stories. New York and London: Harper, 1900.
- —. Wounds in the Rain: War Stories. New York: Frederick A. Stokes Company, 1900.
- —. Great Battles of the World. Philadelphia: Lippincott, 1901.
- —. The Monster. London: Harper, 1901. (Contains The Monster, "The Blue Hotel", "His New Mittens", "Twelve O'Clock", "Moonlight on the Snow", "Manacled", and "An Illusion in Red and White".)
- —. Last Words. London, 1902.

== Poetry collections ==
- —. The Black Riders and Other Lines. Boston: Copeland and Day, 1895.
- —. War is Kind and Other Lines. New York: Frederick A. Stokes Company, 1899.

== Unfinished works ==
Sources report that following an encounter with a male prostitute in the spring of 1894, Crane began a novel on the subject entitled Flowers of Asphalt. He reportedly abandoned the project and the manuscript has never been recovered.
