= Flowers of Asphalt =

Unfinished novel attributed to Stephen Crane

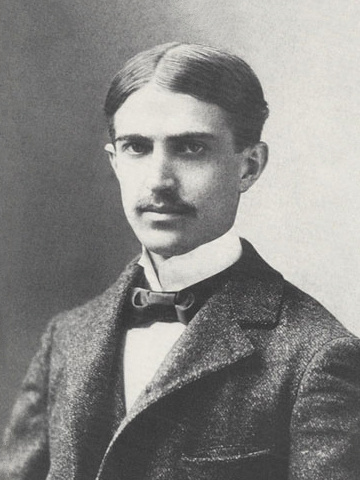
Crane in 1896

Flowers of Asphalt is an unfinished novel attributed to American writer Stephen Crane. The novel, said to have been started in 1894, was to be about a male prostitute. No trace of the manuscript has ever been found.

== Genesis ==
The genesis of the novel is reported in a document found among the papers of Crane biographer Thomas Beer. The document is an unsigned letter that Crane biographer John Berryman attributed to James Huneker, an older acquaintance of Crane's. The letter reads:

One night in April or May of 1894, I ran into Crane on Broadway and we started over to the Everett House together, I'd been at a theater with Saltus and was in evening dress. In the Square a kid came up and begged from us. I was drunk enough to give him a quarter. He followed along and I saw he was really soliciting. Crane was damned innocent about everything but women and didn't see what the boy's game was. We got to the Everett House and we could see that the kid was painted. He was very handsome—looked like a Rossetti angel—big violet eyes—probably full of belladonna. He took the kid in and fed him supper. Got him to talk. The kid had syphilis, of course—most of that type do—and wanted money to have himself treated. Crane rang up Irving Bacheller and borrowed fifty dollars.

He pumped a mass of details out of the boy whose name was something like Coolan and began a novel about a boy prostitute. I made him read À Rebours which he didn't like very much. Thought it stilted. This novel began with a scene in a railroad station. Probably the best passage of prose that Crane ever wrote. Boy from the country running off to see New York. He read the thing to Garland who was horrified and begged him to stop. I don't know that he ever finished the book. He was going to call it Flowers of Asphalt.

== Questions ==
Whether Crane actually began Flowers of Asphalt remains an open question. Acknowledging that its attestation is not the greatest, Berryman noted that the projected theme was in line with the themes of other Crane works, including Maggie: A Girl of the Streets, George's Mother and to a lesser degree The Red Badge of Courage: "the movement in youth from innocence to experience, seen as degradation." He further cited a letter that Crane sent to Hamlin Garland in June 1894 in which Crane reported he was working on a new novel, a letter Huneker could not have known about. The relationship between Garland and Crane deteriorated and Berryman suggested that it could have been as a consequence of how disturbing Garland found the excerpt of Flowers of Asphalt Crane supposedly read to him and Crane's resentment at following Garland's advice to abandon it. Finally, the purported title, the report of Crane's opinion of À rebours and the railway station setting led him to conclude that the account was genuine.

Writer and critic Samuel R. Delany cast doubt on the veracity of the Huneker letter, noting that it is unsigned and not written in Huneker's usual style, lacking any salutation. Delany allowed for the possibility that Huneker simply wrote the letter quickly or that Beer reconstructed the information from a recollection of an earlier discussion with Huneker. However, Beer's known propensity for fabricating information about Crane makes accepting the passage as factual problematic. Delany speculated that Beer, who was gay, might have created the letter as a way of introducing the idea that Crane was gay or bisexual.

Crane scholar Stanley Wertheim found the account improbable. Crane was impoverished in 1894 and had not yet met Bacheller, making it unlikely that Crane could have borrowed as large a sum as $50 (equivalent to about $1,800 in modern terms) to give to a stranger. He noted that Huneker told writer Vincent Starrett that Crane had started a book called Flowers in Asphalt in October 1898, but at that time Crane was in Havana and was "no longer innocent about New York street life".

== Influence ==
Avant-garde filmmaker Gregory Markopoulos took the title of his 1951 film Flowers of Asphalt from the Crane novel.
