= In the Desert =

1895 poem written by Stephen Crane

- by Stephen Crane
- First published in: 1895
- Country: USA
- Language: English
- Series: The Black Riders and Other Lines
- Publisher: Copeland and Day
- Lines: 10
- Preceded by: Three little birds in a row
- Followed by: Yes, I have a thousand tongues

In the Desert

In the desert
I saw a creature, naked, bestial,
Who, squatting upon the ground,
Held his heart in his hands,
And ate of it.
I said, “Is it good, friend?”
“It is bitter—bitter,” he answered;

“But I like it
“Because it is bitter,
“And because it is my heart.”

"In the Desert" is the name given to a poem written by Stephen Crane (1871–1900), published in 1895 as a part of his collection, The Black Riders and Other Lines. "In the Desert" is the third of fifty-six short poems published in this volume. The poem is only ten lines and briefly describes an interaction between the speaker and a "creature, naked, bestial" encountered "in the desert", eating his heart.

== Criticism ==
Joseph Katz states that "In the Desert" presents an interaction between a primary voice reporting an incident ("In the desert / I saw a creature, naked, bestial") and a second character representing a position which is perceived to be inferior. The primary speaker assumes a dominant role over the "creature".

"In the Desert" also serves as an example of Crane's tendency to state universal truths, and this leads to Crane's use of abstraction. Though Crane has this tendency, his use of abstraction is tempered by his allegory and parable. Crane uses only two characters in a general form, the speaker and the creature, and both characters serve the larger purpose of the narrative. They do not hold importance due to their individual characteristics.

"In the Desert" presents an ambiguous state of mind, but affirms a stance toward God and the Universe. In this poem, no particular sin is pointed out to the reader; instead, Crane shows that human nature is inherently sinful and corrupt. Max Cavitch writes, that "In the Desert" is well-deserving of a permanent place in American literature along with Crane's The Black Riders.

== See also ==
- Stephen Crane bibliography
