= The Black Riders and Other Lines =

Book by Stephen Crane

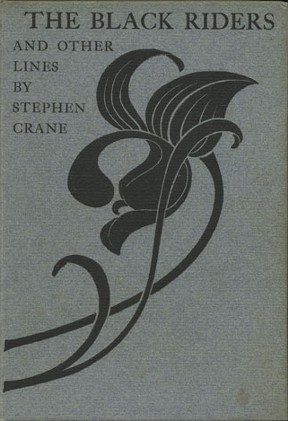
- Cover of the first edition
- Author: Stephen Crane
- Language: English
- Genre: Poetry
- Published: 1895 (Copeland & Day)
- Publication place: United States

The Black Riders and Other Lines is a book of poetry written by American author Stephen Crane (1871–1900). It was first published in 1895 by Copeland & Day.

== Composition and publication history ==
In the winter of 1893, Crane borrowed a suit from John Northern Hilliard and visited the critic and editor William Dean Howells, who introduced Crane to the poetry of Emily Dickinson. Crane was inspired by her writing and, within several months, wrote the beginnings of what became his first book of poetry. One friend recalled that he saw Crane's first attempts at poetry in mid-February 1894 and Hamlin Garland claimed in a later reminiscence that Crane brought him a pile of manuscripts the next month. Crane told friends that the poems came to him spontaneously and as pictures, saying, "They came, and I wrote them, that's all."

The Black Riders and Other Lines was published in May 1895 by Copeland & Day and marked Crane's first serious venture into poetry. It was Crane's second published volume, following Maggie: A Girl of the Streets (1893) and predating The Red Badge of Courage (1895). Its first printing was a limited run of 500 copies, with a few issued in vellum. The collection contained sixty-eight short poems written in Crane's sparse, unconventional style. The untitled "lines", as Crane referred to them, were differentiated by Roman numerals and written entirely in small capitals. Crane was 23 years old when the book was published.

== Response ==
Many of the poems in The Black Riders and Other Lines depict a vengeful God inspired by the Old Testament interacting with disrespectful humans. Critics were especially focused on the book's apparent anti-religious themes. Harriet Monroe wrote that the book "is full of wisdom of yesteryear... as old-fashioned as Bob Ingersoll's fiery denunciations. Crane's startling utterances... somehow cease to startle after twenty years." Amy Lowell, however, found these themes reflective of Crane's own struggle with belief: "He disbelieved it and he hated it, but he could not free himself from it... Crane's soul was heaped with bitterness and this bitterness he flung back at the theory of life which had betrayed him". Elbert Hubbard, who had encouraged Crane's unusual poetry, was impressed by their unconventional structure: "The 'Lines' in The Black Riders seem to me wonderful: charged with meaning like a storage battery. But there is a fine defy in the flavour that warns the reader not to take too much or it may strike in. Who wants a meal of horseradish?"

Crane himself thought The Black Riders a superior work to his more famous novel The Red Badge of Courage. As he wrote, "the former is the more ambitious effort. In it, I am to give my ideas of life as a whole, so far as I know it, and the latter is a mere episode,—an amplification".

== Poetry ==
- Black riders came from the sea.
- Three little birds in a row
- In the Desert
- Yes, I have a thousand tongues
- Once there came a man
- God fashioned the ship of the world carefully
- Mystic shadow, bending near me,
- I looked here
- I stood upon a high place,
- Should the wide world roll away,
- In a lonely place,
- "And the sins of the fathers shall be"
- If there is a witness to my little life,
- There was a crimson clash of war.
- "Tell brave deeds of war."
- There were many who went in huddled procession
- In heaven
- A god in wrath
- A learned man came to me once
- There was, before me
- Once I saw mountains angry
- Places among the stars
- I saw a man pursuing the horizon
- Behold, the grave of a wicked man
- There was set before me a mighty hill
- A youth in apparel that glittered
- "Truth," said a traveller
- Behold, from the land of the farther suns
- Supposing that I should have the courage
- Many workmen
- Two or three angels
- There was one I met upon the road
- I stood upon a highway
- A man saw a ball of gold in the sky
- I met a seer
- On the horizon the peaks assembled
- The ocean said to me once
- The livid lightnings flashed in the clouds
- And you love me
- Love walked alone
- I walked in a desert
- There came whisperings in the winds
- I was in the darkness
- Tradition, thou art for suckling children
- Many red devils ran from my heart
- "Think as I think," said a man
- Once there was a man
- I stood musing in a black world
- You say you are holy
- A man went before a strange God
- Why do you strive for greatness, fool?
- Blustering God
- "It was wrong to do this," said the angel
- A man toiled on a burning road
- A man feared that he might find an assassin
- With eye and with gesture
- The sage lectured brilliantly
- Walking in the sky
- Upon the road of my life
- There was a man and a woman
- There was a man who lived a life of fire
- There was a great cathedral
- Friend, your white beard sweeps the ground
- Once, I knew a fine song
- If I should cast off this tattered coat
- God lay dead in heaven
- A spirit sped

== See also ==
- Stephen Crane bibliography
