= Thomas Beer (disambiguation) =

Thomas Beer (1889–1940) was an American author.

Thomas Beer may also refer to:

- Tom E. Beer (born 1969), American football player
- Tom Beer (born 1944), American football player
