= The Red Badge of Courage =

1895 war novel by Stephen Crane

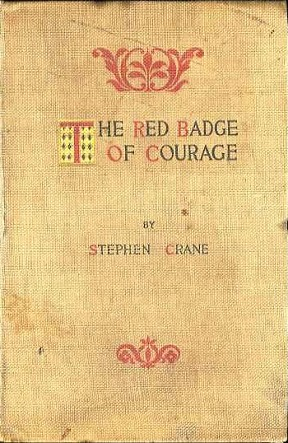
First book edition cover of The Red Badge of Courage (1895)

The Red Badge of Courage is an 1895 war novel by American author Stephen Crane. The novel was published on 3 October 1895. Taking place during the American Civil War, the story is about a young private of the Union Army, Henry Fleming, who flees from the field of battle. Overcome with shame, he longs for a wound, a "red badge of courage", to counteract his cowardice. When his regiment once again faces the enemy, Henry acts as flag-bearer, carrying the regimental colors.

Although Crane was born after the war, and had not at the time experienced battle first-hand, the novel is known for its realism and naturalism. He began writing what would become his second novel in 1894, using various contemporary and written accounts (such as those published previously by Century Magazine) as inspiration. It is believed that he based the fictional battle on that of Chancellorsville; he may also have interviewed veterans of the 124th New York Volunteer Infantry Regiment, commonly known as the Orange Blossoms. Initially shortened and serialized in newspapers in December 1894, the novel was published in full in October 1895. A longer version of the work, based on Crane's original manuscript, was published in 1982.

The novel is known for its distinctive style, which includes realistic battle sequences as well as the repeated use of color imagery, and ironic tone. Separating itself from a traditional war narrative, Crane's story reflects the inner experience of its protagonist (a soldier fleeing from combat) rather than the external world around him. Also notable for its use of what Crane called a "psychological portrayal of fear", the novel's allegorical and symbolic qualities are often debated by critics. Several of the themes that the story explores are maturation, heroism, cowardice, and the indifference of nature. The Red Badge of Courage garnered widespread acclaim, what H. G. Wells called "an orgy of praise", shortly after its publication, making Crane an instant celebrity at the age of twenty-four. The novel and its author did have their initial detractors, however, including author and veteran Ambrose Bierce. Adapted several times for the screen, the novel became a bestseller. Never out of print, it is Crane's most important work and a major American text.

== Background ==
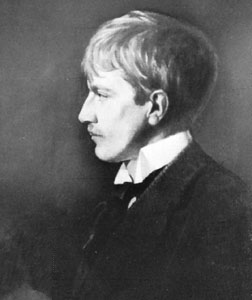
Stephen Crane in 1894; print of a portrait by artist and friend Corwin K. Linson

Stephen Crane published his first novel, Maggie: A Girl of the Streets, in March 1893 at the age of 21. Maggie was not a success, either financially or critically. Most critics thought the unsentimental Bowery tale crude or vulgar, and Crane chose to publish the work privately after it was repeatedly rejected for publication. Crane found inspiration for his next novel while spending hours lounging in a friend's studio in the early summer of 1893. There, he became fascinated with issues of Century Magazine that were largely devoted to famous battles and military leaders from the Civil War. Frustrated with the dryly written stories, Crane stated, "I wonder that some of those fellows don't tell how they felt in those scraps. They spout enough of what they did, but they're as emotionless as rocks." Returning to these magazines during subsequent visits to the studio, he decided to write a war novel. He later stated that he "had been unconsciously working the detail of the story out through most of his boyhood" and had imagined "war stories ever since he was out of knickerbockers."

At the time, Crane was intermittently employed as a freelance writer, contributing articles to various New York City newspapers. He began writing what would become The Red Badge of Courage in June 1893, while living with his older brother Edmund in Lake View, New Jersey. Crane conceived the story from the point of view of a young private who is at first filled with boyish dreams of the glory of war, only to become disillusioned by war's reality. He took the private's surname, "Fleming", from his sister-in-law's maiden name. He would later relate that the first paragraphs came to him with "every word in place, every comma, every period fixed." Working mostly nights, he wrote from around midnight until four or five in the morning. Because he could not afford a typewriter, he carefully wrote in ink on legal-sized paper, occasionally crossing through or overlying a word. If he changed something, he would rewrite the whole page. He later moved to New York City, where he completed the novel in April 1894.

== Publication history ==
The title of Crane's original, 55,000-word manuscript was "Private Fleming/His various battles", but in order to create the sense of a less traditional Civil War narrative, he ultimately changed the title to The Red Badge of Courage: An Episode of the American Civil War. In early 1894, Crane submitted the manuscript to S. S. McClure, who held on to it for six months without publication. Frustrated, the author asked for the manuscript to be returned, after which he gave it to Irving Bacheller in October. An abbreviated version of Crane's story was first serialized in The Philadelphia Press in December 1894. This version of the story, which was culled to 18,000 words by an editor specifically for the serialization, was reprinted in newspapers across America, establishing Crane's fame. Crane biographer John Berryman wrote that the story was published in at least 200 small city dailies and approximately 550 weekly papers. In October 1895, a version, which was 5,000 words shorter than the original manuscript, was printed in book form by D. Appleton & Company. This version of the novel differed greatly from Crane's original manuscript; the deletions were thought by some scholars to be due to demands by an Appleton employee who was afraid of public disapproval of the novel's content. Parts of the original manuscript removed from the 1895 version include all of the twelfth chapter, as well as the endings to chapters seven, ten and fifteen.

Crane's contract with Appleton allowed him to receive a flat ten percent royalty of all copies sold. However, the contract also stipulated that he was not to receive royalties from the books sold in Great Britain, where they were released by Heinemann in early 1896 as part of its Pioneer Series. In 1982, W. W. Norton & Company published a version of the novel based on Crane's original 1894 manuscript of 55,000 words. Edited by Henry Binder, this version is questioned by those who believe Crane made the original edits for the 1895 Appleton edition of his own accord. Since its initial publication, the novel has never gone out of print.

== Plot summary ==
On a cold day, the fictional 304th New York Infantry Regiment awaits battle beside a river. Private Henry Fleming, a young teenaged recruit, remembers his romantic reasons for enlisting as well as his mother's resulting protests, wonders whether he will remain brave in the face of fear or turn and run back. He is comforted by one of his friends from home, Jim Conklin, who admits that he would run from battle if his fellow soldiers also fled. During the regiment's first battle, Confederate soldiers charge, but are repelled. The enemy quickly regroups and attacks again, this time forcing some of the unprepared Union soldiers to flee. Fearing the battle is a lost cause, Henry deserts his regiment. It is not until after he reaches the rear of the army that he overhears a general announcing the Union's victory.

In despair, he declared that he was not like those others. He now conceded it to be impossible that he should ever become a hero. He was a craven loon. Those pictures of glory were piteous things. He groaned from his heart and went staggering off.

— The Red Badge of Courage, Chapter eleven

Ashamed, Henry escapes into a nearby forest, where he discovers a decaying body in a peaceful clearing. In his distress, he hurriedly leaves the clearing and stumbles upon a group of injured men returning from battle. One member of the group, a "tattered soldier", asks Henry where he is wounded, but the youth dodges the question. Among the group is Conklin, who has been shot in the side and is suffering delirium from blood loss. Jim eventually dies of his injury, defiantly resisting aid from his friend, and an enraged and helpless Henry runs from the wounded soldiers. He next comes upon a retreating column that is in disarray. In the panic, a man hits Henry on the head with his rifle, wounding him. Exhausted, hungry, thirsty, and now wounded, Henry decides to return to his regiment regardless of his shame. When he arrives at camp, the other soldiers believe his injury resulted from a grazing bullet during battle. The other men care for the youth, dressing his wound.

The next morning Henry goes into battle for the third time. His regiment encounters an isolated Confederate unit, and in the ensuing fight Henry proves to be a capable soldier, comforted by the belief that his previous cowardice had not been noticed, as he "had performed his mistakes in the dark, so he was still a man". Afterward, while looking for a stream from which to obtain water with a friend, he discovers from his commanding officer that his regiment has a lackluster reputation. The officer speaks casually about sacrificing the 304th because they are nothing more than "mule drivers" and "mud diggers". With no other regiments to spare, the general orders his men forward.

In the final battle, Henry acts as the flag-bearer after the color sergeant falls. A line of Confederates, hidden behind a fence beyond a clearing, shoots with impunity at Henry's regiment, which is ill-covered in the tree-line. Facing withering fire if they stay and disgrace if they retreat, the officers order a charge. Unarmed, Henry leads the men while entirely escaping injury. Most of the Confederates run before the regiment arrives, and four of the remaining men are taken prisoner. The novel closes with the following passage:

It rained. The procession of weary soldiers became a bedraggled train, despondent and muttering, marching with churning effort in a trough of liquid brown mud under a low, wretched sky. Yet the youth smiled, for he saw that the world was a world for him, though many discovered it to be made of oaths and walking sticks. He had rid himself of the red sickness of battle. The sultry nightmare was in the past. He had been an animal blistered and sweating in the heat and pain of war. He turned now with a lover's thirst to images of tranquil skies, fresh meadows, cool brooks, an existence of soft and eternal peace. Over the river a golden ray of sun came through the hosts of leaden rain clouds.

== Historical accuracy and inspiration ==
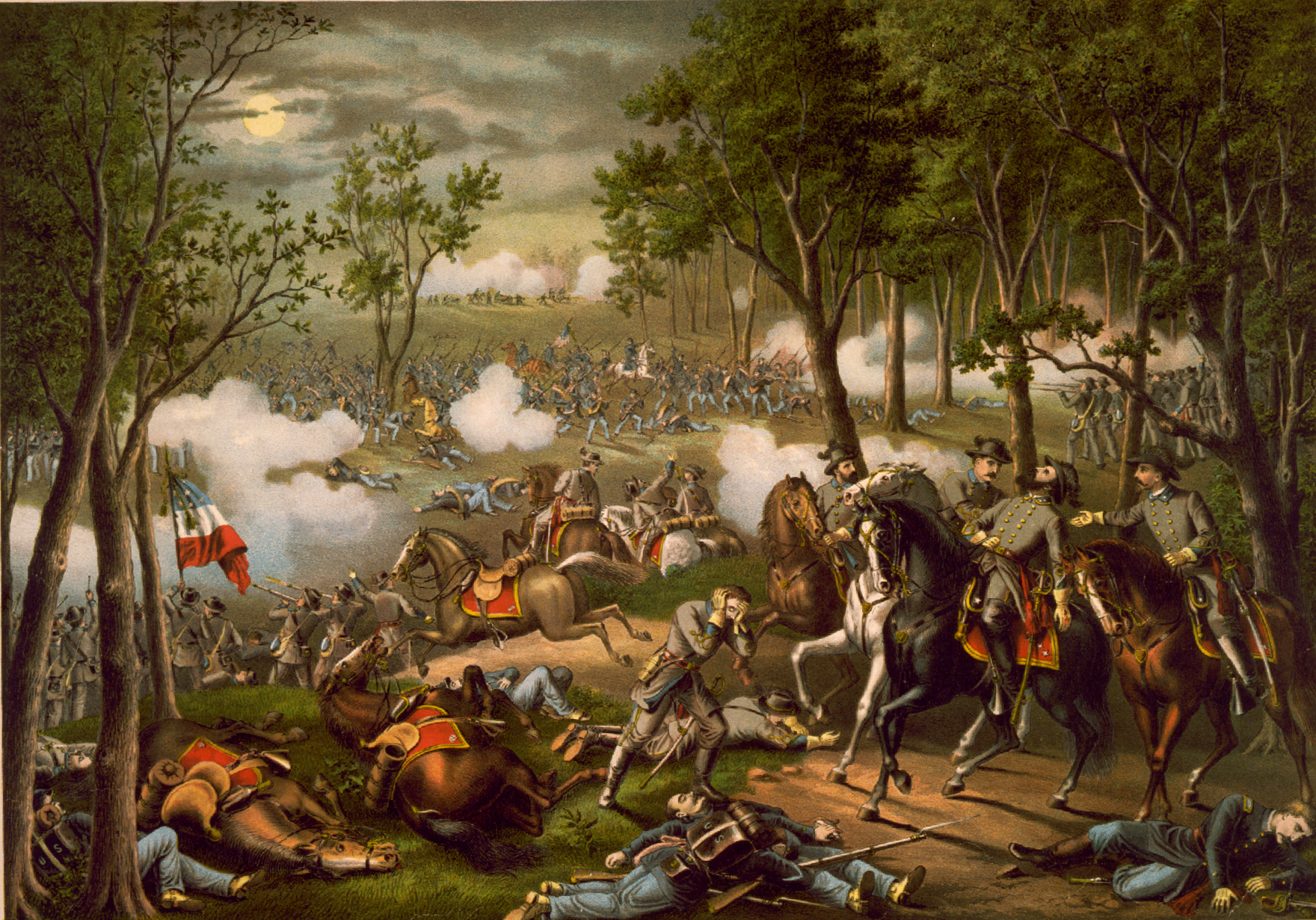
Battle of Chancellorsville, published by Kurz and Allison

Although Crane once wrote in a letter, "You can tell nothing ... unless you are in that condition yourself," he wrote The Red Badge of Courage without any experience of war. He would, however, later serve as a war correspondent during the Greco-Turkish and Spanish–American Wars. Nevertheless, the realistic portrayal of the battlefield in The Red Badge of Courage has often misled readers into thinking that Crane (despite being born six years after the end of the Civil War) was himself a veteran. While trying to explain his ability to write about battle realistically, Crane stated: "Of course, I have never been in a battle, but I believe that I got my sense of the rage of conflict on the football field, or else fighting is a hereditary instinct, and I wrote intuitively; for the Cranes were a family of fighters in the old days".

Crane drew from a variety of sources in order to realistically depict battle. Century's "Battles and Leaders" series served as direct inspiration for the novel, and one story in particular (Warren Lee Goss's "Recollections of a Private") contains many parallels to Crane's work. Thomas Beer wrote in his problematic 1923 biography that Crane was challenged by a friend to write The Red Badge of Courage after having announced that he could do better than Émile Zola's La Débâcle. This anecdote, however, has not been substantiated. The metaphor of the "red badge of courage" itself may have been inspired by true events; historian Cecil D. Eby, Jr. noted that Union officer Philip Kearny insisted his troops wear bright red unit insignia patches, which became known as marks of valor and bravery. While the 304th New York Volunteer Infantry is fictional, many strategies and occurrences in the novel echo actual events during the Civil War. Details concerning specific campaigns during the war, especially regarding battle formations and actions during the Battle of Chancellorsville, have been noted by critics.

It is believed that Crane listened to war stories in the town square of Port Jervis, New York (where his family at times resided) told by members of the 124th New York Volunteer Infantry Regiment, commonly known as the Orange Blossoms. The Orange Blossoms first saw battle at Chancellorsville, which is believed by local historians to have been the inspiration for the battle depicted in The Red Badge of Courage. Furthermore, there was a Private James Conklin who served in the 124th New York Volunteer Infantry Regiment, and Crane's short story "The Veteran", which was published in McClure's Magazine the year after The Red Badge of Courage, depicts an elderly Henry Fleming who specifically identifies his first combat experience as having occurred at Chancellorsville.

== Style and genre ==
A river, amber-tinted in the shadow of its banks, purled at the army's feet; and at night, when the stream had become of a sorrowful blackness, one could see across it the red, eyelike gleam of hostile camp-fires set in the low brows of distant hills.

— The Red Badge of Courage, Chapter one

The Red Badge of Courage has a distinctive style, which is often described as naturalistic, realistic, impressionistic or a mixture of the three. Told in a third-person limited point of view, the novel reflects the inner-experience of Henry Fleming, a young soldier who flees from combat, rather than upon the external world around him. The Red Badge of Courage is notable in its vivid descriptions and well-cadenced prose, both of which help create suspense within the story. Critics in particular have pointed to the repeated use of color imagery throughout the novel, both literal and figurative, as examples of the novel's use of Impressionism. Blue and gray uniforms are mentioned, as are yellow and orange sunlight, and green forests, while men's faces grow red with rage or courage, and gray with death. Crane also uses animalistic imagery to comment upon people, nature, and war itself. For example, the novel begins by portraying the army as a living entity that is "stretched out on the hills, resting."

While the novel takes place during a series of battles, The Red Badge of Courage is not a traditional Civil War narrative. Focusing on the complex internal struggle of its main character, rather than on the war itself, Crane's novel often divides readers as to whether the story is intended to be either for or against war. By avoiding political, military, and geographic details, the story becomes divorced from its historical context. Notably lacking are the dates in which the action takes place, and the name of the battle; these omissions effectively shift attention away from historical patterns in order to concentrate on the emotional violence of battle in general. The writer alluded to as much in a letter, in which he stated he wished to depict war through "a psychological portrayal of fear."

Writing years after the novel's debut, author Joseph Conrad agreed that the novel's main struggle was internal rather than external, and that Fleming "stands before the unknown. He would like to prove to himself by some reasoning process that he will not 'run from the battle'. And in his unblooded regiment he can find no help. He is alone with the problem of courage." Crane's realistic portrayal of the psychological struck a chord with reviewers; as one contemporary critic wrote for The New York Press: "At times the description is so vivid as to be almost suffocating. The reader is right down in the midst of it where patriotism is dissolved into its elements and where only a dozen men can be seen, firing blindly and grotesquely into the smoke. This is war from a new point of view."

At times he regarded the wounded soldiers in an envious way. He conceived persons with torn bodies to be peculiarly happy. He wished that he, too, had a wound, a red badge of courage.

— The Red Badge of Courage, Chapter nine

With its heavy use of irony, symbolism and metaphor, the novel also lends itself to less straightforward readings. As with many of Crane's fictional works, the novel's dialogue often uses distinctive local dialects, contributing to its apparent historicity; for example, Jim Conklin muses at the beginning of the novel: "I s'pose we must go reconnoiterin' 'round th' kentry jest t' keep 'em from gittin' too clost, or t'develope'm, or something". The ironic tone increases in severity as the novel progresses, especially in terms of the ironic distance between the narrator and protagonist. The title of the work itself is ironic; Henry wishes "that he, too, had a wound, a red badge of courage", echoing a wish to have been wounded in battle. The wound he does receive (from the rifle butt of a fleeing Union soldier), however, is not a badge of courage but a badge of shame.

By substituting epithets for characters' names ("the youth", "the tattered soldier"), Crane injects an allegorical quality into his work, making his characters point to a specific characteristic of man. There have been numerous interpretations concerning hidden meanings within The Red Badge of Courage. Beginning with Robert W. Stallman's 1968 Crane biography, several critics have explored the novel in terms of Christian allegory. In particular, the death of Henry Fleming's Christ-like friend, Jim Conklin, is noted for evidence of this reading, as well as the concluding sentence of chapter nine, which refers to the sun as "fierce wafer" in the sky. John Berryman was one of the first critics to interpret the novel as a modern wasteland through which the protagonist plays the role of an Everyman. Still others read the novel as having a Naturalist structure, comparing the work to those by Theodore Dreiser, Frank Norris and Jack London.

== Themes ==
As the title of the work suggests, the main theme of the novel deals with Henry Fleming's attempt to prove himself a worthy soldier by earning his "red badge of courage". The first twelve chapters, until he receives his accidental wound, expose his cowardice. The following chapters detail his growth and apparently resulting heroism. Before the onset of battle, the novel's protagonist romanticized war; what little he knew about battle he learned from books: "He had read of marches, sieges, conflicts, and he had longed to see it all". Therefore, when confronted by the harsh realities of war, Henry is shocked, and his idealism falters. Finding solace in existential thoughts, he internally fights to make sense of the senseless world in which he finds himself. When he seems to come to terms with his situation, he is yet again forced into the fears of battle, which threaten to strip him of his enlightened identity. Joseph Hergesheimer wrote in his introduction to the 1925 Knopf edition of the novel that, at its heart, The Red Badge of Courage was a "story of the birth, in a boy, of a knowledge of himself and of self-command."

However, the text is ambiguous, making it questionable that Henry ever matures. As critic Donald Gibson stated in The Red Badge of Courage: Redefining the Hero, "the novel undercuts itself. It says there is no answer to the questions it raises; yet it says the opposite.... It says that Henry Fleming finally sees things as they are; it says he is a deluded fool. It says that Henry does not see things as they are; but no one else does either." Although Crane critic and biographer Stallman wrote of Henry's "spiritual change" by the end of the story, he also found this theme difficult to champion in light of the novel's enigmatic ending. Although Henry "progresses upwards toward manhood and moral triumph", as he begins to mature by taking leave of his previous "romantic notions," "the education of the hero ends as it began: in self deception." Critic William B. Dillingham also noted the novel's heroism paradox, especially in terms of the introspective Henry's lapse into unreasoning self-abandon in the second half of the book. Dillingham stated that "in order to be courageous, a man in time of physical strife must abandon the highest of his human facilities, reason and imagination, and act instinctively, even animalistically."

The indifference of the natural world is a reoccurring theme in Crane's work. At the beginning of the novel, as the regiments advance toward battle, the sky is described as being an innocuous "fairy blue." In chapter seven, Henry notes the inexplicable tranquility of nature, "a woman with a deep aversion to tragedy", even as the battle rages on. Similarly, Heaven itself is indifferent to the slaughter he encounters on the battlefield. The dichotomy between nature's sweetness and war's destructiveness is further described in chapter eighteen: "A cloud of dark smoke as from smoldering ruins went up toward the sun now bright and gay in the blue, enameled sky." After his desertion, however, Henry finds some comfort in the laws of nature, which seem to briefly affirm his previous cowardice:

This landscape gave him assurance. A fair field holding life. It was the religion of peace. It would die if its timid eyes were compelled to see blood.... He threw a pine cone at a jovial squirrel, and he ran with chattering fear. High in a treetop he stopped, and, poking his head cautiously from behind a branch, looked down with an air of trepidation. The youth felt triumphant at this exhibition. There was the law, he said. Nature had given him a sign. The squirrel, immediately upon recognizing danger, had taken to his legs without ado. He did not stand stolidly baring his furry belly to the missile, and die with an upward glance at the sympathetic heavens. On the contrary, he had fled as fast as his legs could carry him.

== Reception ==
The Red Badge of Courage received generally positive reviews from critics on its initial publication; in particular, it was said to be a remarkably modern and original work. Appleton's 1895 publication went through ten editions in the first year alone, making Crane an overnight success at the age of twenty-four. H. G. Wells, a friend of the author, later wrote that the novel was greeted by an "orgy of praise" in England and the United States. An anonymous reviewer for The New York Press wrote shortly after the novel's initial publication that "One should be forever slow in charging an author with genius, but it must be confessed that The Red Badge of Courage is open to the suspicion of having greater power and originality than can be girdled by the name of talent." The reviewer for The New York Times was impressed by Crane's realistic portrayal of war, writing that the book "strikes the reader as a statement of facts by a veteran", a sentiment that was echoed by the reviewer for The Critic, who called the novel "a true book; true to life, whether it be taken as a literal transcript of a soldier's experiences in his first battle, or... a great parable of the inner battle which every man must fight."

The novel, however, did have its initial detractors. Some critics found Crane's young age and inexperience troubling, rather than impressive. For example, one reviewer wrote, "As Mr. Crane is too young a man to write from experience, the frightful details of his book must be the outcome of a very feverish imagination." Crane and his work also received criticism from veterans of the war; one in particular, Alexander C. McClurg, a brigadier general who served through the Chickamauga and Chattanooga campaigns, wrote a lengthy letter to The Dial (which his publishing company owned) in April 1896, lambasting the novel as "a vicious satire upon American soldiers and American armies." Author and veteran Ambrose Bierce, popular for his Civil War-fiction, also expressed contempt for the novel and its writer. When a reviewer for The New York Journal referred to The Red Badge of Courage as a poor imitation of Bierce's work, Bierce responded by congratulating them for exposing "the Crane freak". Some reviewers also found fault with Crane's narrative style, grammar mistakes, and apparent lack of traditional plot.

While it eventually became a bestseller in the United States, The Red Badge of Courage was more popular and sold more rapidly in England when it was published in late 1895. Crane was delighted with his novel's success overseas, writing to a friend: "I have only one pride and that is that the English edition of The Red Badge of Courage has been received with great praise by the English reviewers. I am proud of this simply because the remoter people would seem more just and harder to win." Critic, veteran and Member of Parliament George Wyndham called the novel a "masterpiece", applauding Crane's ability to "stage the drama of man, so to speak, within the mind of one man, and then admits you as to a theatre." Harold Frederic wrote in his own review that "If there were in existence any books of a similar character, one could start confidently by saying that it was the best of its kind. But it has no fellows. It is a book outside of all classification. So unlike anything else is it that the temptation rises to deny that it is a book at all". Frederic, who would later befriend Crane when the latter relocated to England in 1897, juxtaposed the novel's treatment of war to those by Leo Tolstoy, Émile Zola and Victor Hugo, all of whose works he believed to be "positively... cold and ineffectual" when compared to The Red Badge of Courage.

== Legacy ==
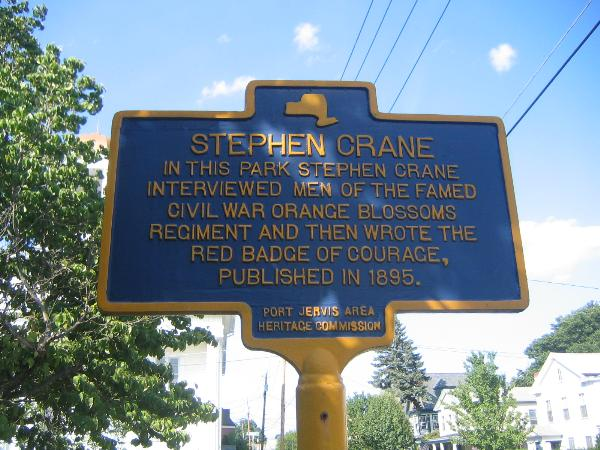
Historical marker in Port Jervis, New York, commemorating Crane

Crane himself later wrote about the novel: "I don't think The Red Badge to be any great shakes but then the very theme of it gives it an intensity that the writer can't reach every day." For the remainder of Crane's short career (he died from tuberculosis at the age of 28), The Red Badge of Courage served as the standard against which the rest of his works were compared. Appleton republished the novel again in 1917, shortly after the US entered World War I, reissuing it three additional times that same year.

Since the resurgence of Crane's popularity in the 1920s, The Red Badge of Courage has been deemed a major American text and Crane's most important work. While modern critics have noted Crane's "anticipation of the modern spectacle of war", others, such as Crane scholar Stanley Wertheim, believe the work to be "unquestionably the most realistic novel about the American Civil War". Donald Gibson called the novel "ahead of its time" because it did "not conform to very many contemporary notions about what literature should be and do." The novel has been anthologized numerous times, including in Ernest Hemingway's 1942 collection Men at War: The Best War Stories of All Time. In the introduction, Hemingway wrote that the novel "is one of the finest books of our literature, and I include it entire because it is all as much of a piece as a great poem is." Robert W. Stallman's introduction to the Modern Library's 1951 edition of The Red Badge of Courage contained one of the first modern assessments of the novel. This novel is followed by other works by Crane, such as the novella, Maggie: A Girl of the Streets.

The novel has been adapted several times for the screen. A 1951 film by the same name was directed by John Huston, starring Medal of Honor recipient Audie Murphy as Henry Fleming. Written by Huston and Albert Band, the film suffered from a troubled production history, went over budget, and was cut down to only seventy minutes despite objections from the director. A made-for-television movie was released in 1974, starring Richard Thomas as Fleming, while the 2008 Czech film Tobruk was partly based on The Red Badge of Courage.

The novel is also the inspiration for the title of the South Park episode "The Red Badge of Gayness", which revolves around a Civil War re-enactment.

== General and cited references ==
- Bloom, Harold (1996). Stephen Crane's The Red Badge of Courage. New York: Chelsea House Publishers. ISBN 0-585-25371-4.
- Bloom, Harold (2007). Bloom's Guides: The Red Badge of Courage. New York: Infobase Publishing. ISBN 978-0-7910-9367-2.
- Crane, Stephen (1917). The Red Badge of Courage. New York: D. Appleton and Company.
- Davis, Linda H. (1998). Badge of Courage: The Life of Stephan Crane. New York: Mifflin. ISBN 0-89919-934-8.
- Dillingham, William B. (December 1963). "Insensibility in the Red Badge of Courage". College English. 25 (3): 194–198. doi:10.2307/373687. JSTOR 373687.
- Eby, Cecil D. (1960). "The Source of Crane's Metaphor, 'Red Badge of Courage'". American Literature. 32 (2): 204–207. JSTOR 2922679.
- Gibson, Donald B. (1988). The Red Badge of Courage: Redefining the Hero. Boston: Twayne Publishers. ISBN 0-8057-7961-2.
- Grant, Susan-Mary and Peter J Parish. 2003. Legacy of Disunion: The Enduring Significance of the American Civil War. Baton Rouge: Louisiana State University Press. ISBN 0-8071-2847-3.
- * Gullason, Thomas A. (1961). "Thematic Patterns in Stephen Crane's Early Novels". Nineteenth-Century Fiction. 16 (1): 59–67. doi:10.2307/2932848. JSTOR 2932848..
- Habegger, Alfred. 1990. "Fighting Words: The Talk of Men at War in The Red Badge." Critical Essays on Stephen Crane's The Red Badge of Courage. Ed. Donald Pizer. Boston: G. K. Hall & Co. ISBN 0-8161-8898-X.
- Horsford, Howard C. 1986. "'He Was a Man'". New Essays on The Red Badge of Courage. Ed. Lee Clark Mitchell. Cambridge: Cambridge University Press. ISBN 0-521-30456-3.
- * Johanningsmeier, Charles (2008). "The 1894 Syndicated Newspaper Appearances of The Red Badge of Courage". American Literary Realism. 40 (3): 226–247. doi:10.1353/alr.2008.0023. JSTOR 27747296. S2CID 161735558.
- Kaplan, Amy (1986). "The Spectacle of War in Crane's Revision of History". In Clark Mitchell, Lee (ed.). New Essays on The Red Badge of Courage. Cambridge: Cambridge University Press. ISBN 0-521-30456-3.
- Kent, Thomas (1986). Interpretation and Genre: The Role of Generic Perception in the Study of Narrative Texts. Lewisburg, PA: Bucknell University Press. ISBN 0-8387-5088-5.
- Knapp, Bettina L. (1987). Stephen Crane. New York: Ungar Publishing Co. ISBN 0-8044-2468-3.
- Lentz, Perry (2006). Private Fleming at Chancellorsville: The Red Badge of Courage and the Civil War. Columbia: University of Missouri Press. ISBN 0-8262-1654-4.
- Linson, Corwin K. (1958). My Stephen Crane. Syracuse: Syracuse University Press.
- Mailloux, Steven (1982). Interpretive Conventions: The Reader in the Study of American Fiction. Ithaca, NY: Cornell University Press. ISBN 0-8014-1476-8.
- Mayer, Gary H. (2009). "A General Semantics Approach to the Red Badge of Courage". Etc: A Review of General Semantics. 66 (3): 258–262. JSTOR 42578943.
- Mitchell, Lee Clark (1986). "Introduction". New Essays on The Red Badge of Courage. Cambridge: Cambridge University Press. ISBN 0-521-30456-3.
- Monteiro, George. 2000. Stephen Crane's Blue Badge of Courage. Baton Rouge: Louisiana State University Press. ISBN 0-8071-2578-4.
- Monteiro, George. 2009. Stephen Crane: The Contemporary Reviews. New York: Cambridge University Press. ISBN 0-521-38265-3.
- Morris, Roy Jr. 2007. "On Whose Responsibility? The Historical and Literary Underpinnings of The Red Badge of Courage". Memory and Myth: The Civil War in Fiction and Film from Uncle Tom's Cabin to Cold Mountain. Ed. David B. Sachsman. West Lafayette, Ind.: Purdue University Press. ISBN 978-1-55753-439-2.
- Richardson, Mark. "The Mephistophelean Skepticism of Stephen Crane." In The Wings of Atalanta: Essays Written Along the Color Line Archived 2019-06-16 at the Wayback Machine (pages 110–164). Rochester, New York: Camden House, 2019. ISBN 9781571132390
- Sears, Stephen W. 1996. Chancellorsville. Boston: Houghton-Mifflin Co. ISBN 0-395-63417-2.
- Sorrentino, Paul. 2006. Student Companion to Stephen Crane. Westport, Conn.: Greenwood Press. ISBN 0-313-33104-9.
- Stallman, Robert W. 1968. Stephen Crane: A Biography. New York: Braziller, Inc.
- Weatherford, Richard M. (1997). Stephen Crane: The Critical Heritage. New York: outledge. ISBN 0-415-15936-9.
- Wertheim, Stanley (1997). A Stephen Crane Encyclopedia. Westport, CT: Greenwood Press. ISBN 0-313-29692-8.
- Wertheim, Stanley; Paul, Sorrentino (1994). The Crane Log: A Documentary Life of Stephen Crane, 1871–1900. New York: G. K. Hall & Co. ISBN 0-8161-7292-7.
