= George's Mother =

1896 novella by Stephen Crane

- First edition
- Author: Stephen Crane
- Language: English
- Genre: Fiction, novella
- Set in: New York City
- Publisher: Edward Arnold
- Publication date: April 24, 1896
- Media type: Print
- Pages: 177
- Preceded by: Maggie: A Girl of the Streets

George's Mother is a novella by American novelist Stephen Crane, first published in 1896. The novella is a companion piece to Crane's earlier novella Maggie: A Girl of the Streets, and the title character of that work makes a brief appearance.

== Background ==
Stephen Crane began writing George's Mother in 1893 and finished it in November 1894. However, because its companion novella, Maggie: A Girl of the Streets did poorly commercially, he did not submit it for publication until 1896. Its original title was A Woman Without Weapons.

After Crane finished George's Mother, he wrote to fellow writer Hamlin Garland, triumphantly: "I have just completed a New York book that leaves Maggie at the post. It is my best thing.". Critics of the time, however, were less impressed; Harry Thurston Peck wrote that Crane should not "ask us to accept his old bones and junk as virgin gold." The book was also criticized, like Maggie, for its frank depictions of vice; the sentence "for he had known women of the city's painted legions" was removed from a draft. One champion of the book, however, was Crane's mentor William Dean Howells, who praised what he called its "mastery" and "extraordinary insight."

The Student Companion to Stephen Crane argues that the character of George's mother was based on Crane's own mother, a member of the Women's Christian Temperance Union, and that George may have been modeled on Crane's alcoholic brother of the same name.

== Plot ==
George's Mother details the life of George Kelcey and his mother, who live in the same lower Manhattan tenement house as Maggie from Maggie: A Girl of the Streets. George is an immature man inclined toward melodrama, and his mother constantly berates him in an attempt to make him change his ways, telling him to get a job and go to church.

George is infatuated with Maggie, but when Maggie takes up with another man, he turns to drinking heavily. At a party, George and his drinking buddies get into an altercation, and his friends abandon him. He joins a local gang, but the gang also abandons him when he visits his dying mother instead of joining a fight with them. The story ends with George's mother hallucinating and screaming with George present.
