= Maggie: A Girl of the Streets =

1893 novella by Stephen Crane

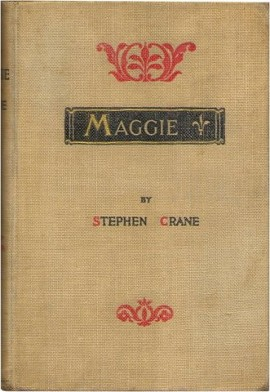
- Cover of first trade edition
- Author: Stephen Crane
- Language: English
- Genre: Novella, tragedy
- Set in: New York City
- Publisher: D. Appleton & Company
- Publication date: March 6, 1893
- Publication place: United States
- Media type: Print
- Pages: 60
- Followed by: George's Mother

Maggie: A Girl of the Streets is an 1893 tragic novella by American author Stephen Crane (1871–1900). The story centers on Margaret "Maggie" Johnson, an 18-year-old girl from the Bowery who is driven to prostitution due to her failed relationship with a young man named Pete Murphy who leaves her for another girl named Nellie Griffiths, and also due to poverty and solitude. The work was considered risqué by publishers because of its literary realism and strong themes. Crane – who was 21 years old at the time – financed the book's publication himself and the original 1893 edition was printed under the pseudonym Johnston Smith. After the success of 1895's The Red Badge of Courage, Maggie was reissued in 1896 with considerable changes and re-writing. The story is followed by George's Mother.

== Plot summary ==
The story opens with Jimmie, at this point a young boy, trying by himself to fight a gang of boys from an opposing neighborhood. He is saved by his friend, Pete Murphy, and comes home to his sister, Maggie, his toddling brother, Tommie, his mother, Mary Johnson, and his brutal and drunken father. The parents, Irish immigrants, terrify the children until they are shuddering in the corner.

Years pass, Tommie and his father die as Jimmie hardens into a sneering, aggressive, cynical youth. He gets a job as a teamster, having no regard for anyone but firetrucks who would run him down. Maggie begins to work in a shirt factory, but her attempts to improve her life are undermined by her mother's drunken rages. Maggie begins to date Jimmie's friend Pete Murphy, who has a job as a bartender and seems a very fine fellow, convinced that he will help her escape the life she leads. He takes her to the theater and the museum. One night Jimmie and Mary accuse Maggie of "Goin to deh devil", essentially kicking her out of the tenement, throwing her lot in with Pete. Jimmie goes to Pete's bar and picks a fight with him (even though he himself has "ruined" other boys' sisters). As the neighbors continue to talk about Maggie, Jimmie and Mary decide to join them in badmouthing her instead of defending her.

Later, Nellie Griffiths, a "woman of brilliance and audacity" convinces Pete to leave Maggie, whom she calls "a little pale thing with no spirit." Thus abandoned, Maggie tries to return home but is rejected by her mother and scorned by the entire tenement. In a later scene, a prostitute, implied to be Maggie, wanders the streets, moving into progressively worse neighborhoods until, reaching the river, she is followed by a grotesque and shabby man. The next scene shows Pete drinking in a saloon with six fashionable women "of brilliance and audacity." He passes out, whereupon one, possibly Nellie, takes his money. In the final chapter, Jimmie tells his mother that Maggie is dead. The mother exclaims, ironically, as the neighbors comfort her, "I'll forgive her!"

== Themes ==
=== Alcoholism ===
Crane uses alcohol to continue a cycle of poverty that the characters cannot break from. Through alcoholism, Joseph Brennan believes that Crane demonstrates that the characters' fates are all inevitable and that their lives cannot be changed. While all the inhabitants of the Bowery drink excessively throughout the book, Crane uses Maggie's mother as a main depiction of the destructive power of alcohol. In her drunken rages, Mary Johnson is described as incredibly violent, abusing Maggie and breaking everything around her. Don Dingledine suggests Mary's drunken actions hinder Maggie's attempts to move up in the world and crush her hopes of doing so. Dingledine sees this in Maggie's attempt to improve her life and rise above her situation, as Maggie decorates and hangs a lambrequin, hoping to attract and impress Pete. Yet, Maggie's attempts to beautify her surroundings prove futile as Mary destroys the curtain while drunk and angry. Then, she publicly condemns her daughter, while inebriated, for her immoral actions with a man, thus isolating Maggie from the community. Brennan agrees arguing that Mary's drunken actions alienate Maggie, pushing her to Pete and her life on the street.

=== Hypocrisy ===
Hypocrisy is prevalent throughout Maggie, as Maggie is faced with hypocritical judgments by her family who hold different standards for her than they do for themselves. Dingledine argues that Maggie's mother drives Maggie away and into the arms of Pete. She then publicly condemns her daughter, further driving Maggie to her demise. Yet, after Maggie's death she displays her grief loudly. Mary's hypocrisy is also displayed with her physical aggression. During one of her violent and drunken tantrums, she threatens to beat her children with shoes. Then, after Maggie's death, Mary holds onto Maggie's baby shoes sentimentally, directly contradicting her aggression toward Maggie while alive. At the same time, Brennan argues that Crane displays hypocrisy when Jimmie avidly voices his displeasure with Maggie's relationship with Pete and condemns Pete for seducing his sister, although Jimmie seduces women himself and casts them off when he is done. Brennan writes that both Mary and Jimmie are the driving forces of Maggie's prostitution, but condemn her when she becomes one, blind to their own faults and part in her downfall.

=== Determinism ===
In Maggie, Don Dingledine believes Crane employs determinism, a theory that everything happening to individuals in the world has already been determined or predestined. Crane uses this theory through demonstrating that Maggie and those around her cannot escape the poverty of living in the Bowery. Paul Stasi adds that according to the theory of determinism, Maggie's poverty, downfall and death are inevitable, and her environment becomes her identity. Since Maggie receives no love from her mother or society, she seeks a better life with Pete. However, her attempts to improve her circumstances fall to pieces as she inevitably cannot succeed, pushing her farther into poverty and into prostitution and showing that her hope is inevitably false. Jordan Von Cannon emphasizes that while her beauty allows her to stand out from the other inhabitants of the Bowery, she cannot move into other social classes because she is predestined by her environment to remain in her class. Maggie is represented as forced by her environment into prostitution rather than by sexual desires; as a result, prostitution for her is not a choice. Marcus Cunliffe explains that Maggie depicts an environment which shapes lives without permission. Paul Stasi adds that this philosophy of determinism is evident in the style of Crane's writing as well. Crane begins every chapter in Maggie with a wide-scale scene description, giving readers a bird's eye perspective which eliminates individuality in the Bowery, showing the residents only as a collective whole. This style of writing reinforces the idea that Maggie is not an individual who can move from her life in the Bowery.

=== Naturalism ===
Maggie is "regarded as the first work of unalloyed naturalism in American fiction." According to the naturalistic principles, a character is set into a world where there is no escape from one's biological heredity. Additionally, the circumstances in which a person finds oneself will dominate one's behavior, depriving the individual of personal responsibility. Although Stephen Crane denied any influence by Émile Zola, the creator of Naturalism, examples in his novella, Maggie: A Girl of the Streets, indicate that he was inspired by French naturalism. The characters in Maggie are stuck in their class without a way out, due to their heritage and their inability to see other perspectives besides their own. Critic Don Dingledine emphasizes how the behavior and actions of the characters in Maggie are influenced by poverty. Maggie is subject to this environment, as it shapes the outcome of her life despite her best effort to improve her circumstances by marrying Pete. Critics debate whether Crane's use of naturalism was intended to create empathy for the characters living in the Bowery or to support the idea that there is a genetic reason why they are impoverished.

=== Gender and sexuality ===
During the nineteenth century, ideas of gender associated primitiveness with femininity. Jordan Von Cannon states that the idea of woman as savage contributed to the classification of women into binaries, such as "the prostitute and the mother". Von Cannon finds the defining difference between the women in these two groups to be their ability to control their sexual desires. According to Von Cannon, it was accepted socially that prostitutes became such due to an inability to control this sexual desire. However, critic Keith Gandal believes that Crane's depiction of Maggie's journey to prostitution shows that it is not her sexual desire, but her environment's influence on her, which drives her to prostitution. Gandal claims that Maggie's sexuality also reflects an alternative class-based morality that views sexuality differently from upper-class ideas of sexual morality.

=== Social class ===
Within the novella, Crane comments on class. The main characters of the novella live in the Bowery, whose inhabitants are poor, typically drunk and violent. Don Dingledine states that Maggie fails to understand the impact of her social class upon her. He claims that Maggie believes that she can move into a higher class, but fails to realize that she lacks the social or cultural capital to do this. In the novella, Maggie believes Pete to be a refined gentleman, when it is obvious to readers, by Crane's ironic narration, that Pete is not. Maggie attempts to dress nicer and make her home appear more beautiful, to no avail. Dingledine argues that Maggie overestimates the effects of her attempts to beautify her home on Pete and on society. After all, he says that despite her efforts, Maggie does not have the tastes or acquired skills of a middle-class woman, meaning that she would not be accepted into that class.

Critic David Hunstperger points out that the use of melodramas for the entertainment of characters within the novella emphasizes a class group reaction to class inequality. He argues that the shared reaction to the melodramas displays an alignment in the beliefs of the Bowery residents. In Maggie, the majority of low class residents drink, gamble and fight each other. Yet, Maggie, a low class woman herself, does not engage in this behavior. Instead, Crane writes, "The girl, Maggie, blossomed in a mud puddle. She grew to be a most rare and wonderful production of a tenement district, a pretty girl. None of the dirt of Rum Alley seemed to be in her veins." Due to these differing portrayals of low-class citizens, critics debate if Crane's intentions for the novella were to critique a social caste system and its effect on those within it, or to point to the failings of a family unit, resulting in the downfall of one member.

== Historical context ==
Maggie was published during the time of industrialization. The United States, a country shaped by agriculture in the 19th century, became an industrialized nation in the late 1800s. Moreover, "an unprecedented influx of immigrants contributed to a boom in population," created bigger cities and a new consumer society. By these developments, progress was linked with poverty, illustrating that the majority of the US population was skeptical about the dependency on the fluctuation of global economy.

== Main characters ==
- James "Jimmie" Johnson: An eldest brother of Maggie and Tommie, who first appears in the beginning scene fighting a gang war of some sort with the Rum Alley Children. Serves as a foil to Maggie.
- Peter "Pete" Murphy: A teenager, in the beginning, who is an acquaintance of Jimmie, and saves Jimmie in the fight. Later, he seduces Maggie and breaks her of her romantic viewpoints.
- Mr Johnson "Father" : The brutal, drunkard father of Jimmie, Maggie, and Tommie.
- Margaret "Maggie" Johnson: The Johnsons' middle child. She is 18 years old, and the titular protagonist of the story, apparently immune to the after-effects of the negative family. She is seduced by Pete and is seen as effectively ruined. She is implied to have become a prostitute at the end of the novel and dies an early and tragic death.
- Thomas "Tommie" Johnson: The youngest Johnson child who dies an early death.
- Mary Johnson: The drunkard and brutal mother who drives Maggie out of the house.
- Mary "Nellie" Griffiths: Pete's friend, who convinces him to leave Maggie.

== Bibliography ==
=== Editions ===
The Works of Stephen Crane edited by Fredson Bowers is regarded as the definitive text of Crane's works, although several textual critics regard the editorial principles behind the first volume (containing Maggie) to be flawed.

- Crane, Stephen Maggie: A Girl of the Streets. (New York and London: W.W. Norton & Co., 1979) ISBN 9780393950243. Edited with a preface and notes by Thomas A. Gullason. Contains the 1893 text, as well as contemporary reviews and modern criticism.
- Crane, Stephen Maggie: A Girl of the Streets and Other Tales of New York. (Harmondsworth: Penguin, 2000) ISBN 9780140437973. Selected and with an introduction by Larzer Ziff, with the assistance of Theo Davies. Also includes George's Mother, and eleven other tales of New York.

=== Works of criticism ===
==== General ====
- Åhnebrink, Lars. The Beginnings of Naturalism in American Fiction (Uppsala: A.-B Lundequistka Bokhandeln, 1950).
- Bergon, Frank Stephen Crane's Artistry (New York and London: Columbia University Press, 1975).

== Adaptations ==
Maggie: A Girl of the Streets was adapted by Stephen Douglas Burton as one of three one-act operas in his 1975 trilogy, An American Triptych.
