= Thomas Beer =

American writer (1889-1940)

Thomas Beer (November 22, 1889 – April 18, 1940) was an American biographer, novelist, essayist, satirist, and author of short fiction.

Born in Council Bluffs, Iowa, Beer graduated from Yale University in 1911 and studied law at Columbia University from 1911 through 1913. He also served during World War I.

Beer was best known for his biographies of Stephen Crane (1923) and Mark Hanna (1929), as well as his study of American manners during the 1890s, The Mauve Decade (1926). He published three novels—The Fair Rewards (1922), Sandoval: A Romance of Bad Manners (1924), and The Road to Heaven: A Romance of Morals (1928)—in addition to more than 130 short stories in The Saturday Evening Post. In 1927, with the help of Eugene Spreicher and Atherton Curtis, Beer produced George W. Bellows: His Lithographs, a catalogue raisonné, with reproductions of the artist's black-and-white lithographs.

A collection of Beer's short stories was published under the title Mrs. Egg and Other Barbarians in 1933. After Beer's death of a heart attack in his apartment in the Hotel Albert in New York, another collection of his short stories, edited by Wilson Follett, was published as Mrs. Egg and Other Americans: Collected Stories (1947). David D. Anderson, in his "Essays on the Ohio Experience", says that the stories are based on Beer's experiences spending his summers at his grandfather's farm in Bucyrus, Ohio until age 20. These two collections are frequently confused: for example, the Columbia Encyclopedia entry on Beer gives the 1933 title for Follett's 1947 collection.

== Reputation ==
During the 1920s and 1930s, Beer was widely celebrated and much read. His fiction may have influenced such modernists as William Faulkner and F. Scott Fitzgerald. According to archivist Robert Nedelkoff,

In the 1950s, during his first lectures at the University of Virginia, Faulkner mentioned that in the days when he read the Saturday Evening Post at his Oxford postmaster's job instead of delivering the magazine, he had admired Thomas Beer's ... stories and had learned something of characterization and plot from them.

By 1980, Beer's reputation had come to rest largely on his Stephen Crane biography. Boasting an introduction by Crane's celebrated friend and older contemporary Joseph Conrad, the 1923 biography cited important Crane letters for which no other source existed, and was instrumental in the revival of Crane's then-eclipsed reputation. It was the first book-length narrative of Crane's life. But by the end of the 1980s, scholars Stanley Wertheim and Paul Sorrentino, working on a new edition of Crane's letters, had discovered that, in Sorrentino's words,

Beer had altered the chronology of Crane's life, invented incidents, and composed letters allegedly from Crane. The pattern of fabrication is evident from the onset. Letters supposedly written by Crane are quoted in an early draft of the biography, then substantially revised in a later draft to fit scenarios involving other people, who, it turns out, are themselves apparently fictional.

In a Web response to a query on Crane biographies, Stanley Wertheim characterized Beer's Crane book as "essentially a biographical novel". This echoes the views of some of the book's first reviewers, unaware though they may have been of Beer's deceptions: Edmund Wilson described the Crane book in The New Republic in late January 1924 as "incredibly entertaining". Mark Van Doren had written the following a few weeks earlier in his review in The Nation: "If the book is indeed a novel, and it reads like one from the first page to the last, it is the sort which Crane might have written about himself if he had had the inclination." The Crane biography was reprinted as a paperback as recently as 2003.

In 2014 three scholars, including two historians and a forensic linguist, determined that Beer had almost certainly also created documents cited in his biography of Mark Hanna.

== Personal life ==
Beer never married. John Clendenning, the biographer of Josiah Royce, is cited in an article in the Des Moines, Iowa Register as having identified Beer as a closeted homosexual and an alcoholic and suggesting that his death was a suicide.
