= William A. Hammond =

American military physician and neurologist

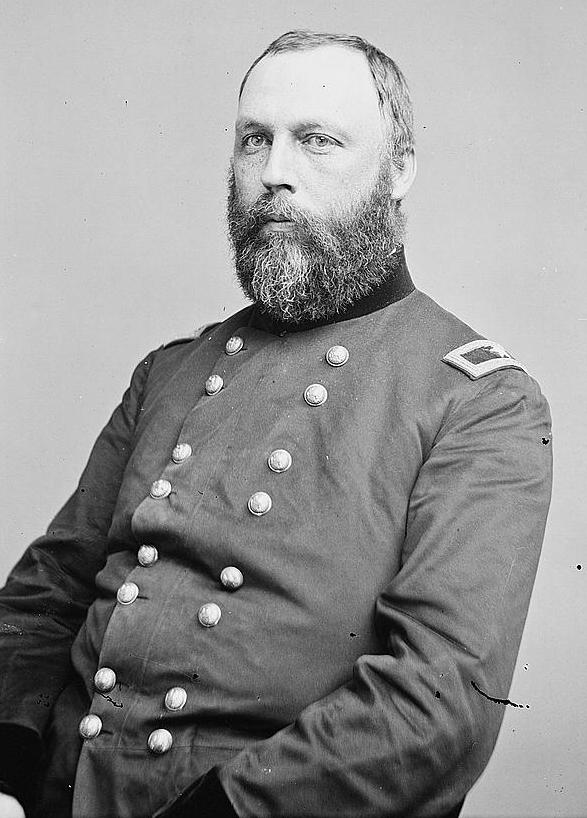
- Born: William Alexander Hammond; August 28, 1828; Annapolis, Maryland
- Died: January 5, 1900 (aged 71); Washington, D.C.
- Burial place: Arlington National Cemetery
- Spouses: Helen Nisbet (married 1849); Esther T. Chapin (married 1886)
- Children: Graeme Hammond; Clara Lanza
- Military career
- Allegiance: United States of America; Union
- Branch: U.S. Army Medical Corps; Union Army
- Service years: 1849–1860, 1861–1864
- Rank: Brigadier General
- Commands: Surgeon General of the U.S. Army
- Conflicts: American Indian Wars; American Civil War
- Other work: Physician; Neurologist

William Alexander Hammond (28 August 1828 – 5 January 1900) was an American military physician and neurologist. During the American Civil War he was the eleventh Surgeon General of the United States Army (1862–1864) and the founder of the Army Medical Museum (now the National Museum of Health and Medicine).

He was the first American physician to devote himself entirely to neurology, the author of the first American treatise about neurology, and one of the founders of the American Neurological Association.

== Biography ==
Born in Annapolis (Maryland), Hammond grew up in Harrisburg (Pennsylvania). He received his M.D. from New York University at the age of 20. After his internship and a few months in private practice he became assistant-surgeon in the United States Army, serving from 1849 to 1860. He was first sent to New Mexico and took part in the Sioux Wars. While on sick leave, he visited military hospitals in Europe. He conducted research over many years and the resulting paper was awarded a prize by the American Medical Association in 1857. With a common interest in poisons acting on the nervous system (among them snake venom), he wrote a paper with Silas Weir Mitchell that was published in 1859. He was elected to the American Philosophical Society that same year.

While serving at Fort Riley as medical director, Hammond also collected biological specimens. In 1860 he accepted a chair of anatomy and physiology at the University of Maryland School of Medicine in Baltimore and left the army.

=== Civil War ===
When the American Civil War broke out Hammond spent some time at the Baltimore infirmary then joined the army (without recognition of his past service) on 28 May 1861, a month a half after the beginning of the hostilities. Surgeon General Clement Finley soon transferred him to West Virginia under the command of General William Starke Rosecrans command "to lessen his visibility". There Hammond met Jonathan Letterman. Hammond worked with Letterman and Rosecrans on the design of a new ambulance wagon.

The atmosphere in the upper levels of medical services was then one of internal strife and personal conflicts. Hammond—a tall and imposing young man—was no man of intrigue, nor even, according to all accounts, a very flexible person. However, the situation offered him the possibility for advancement. When Finley, the 10th Surgeon General, was fired after an argument with Secretary of War Edwin M. Stanton, Abraham Lincoln, against Stanton's advice and the normal rules of promotion, named the 34-year-old Hammond to succeed him with the rank of brigadier general. Hammond became Surgeon General of the Army on 25 April 1862, less than a year after rejoining the army.

==== Surgeon General ====
Hammond launched a number of reforms. He raised the requirements for admission into the Army Medical Corps. The number of hospitals was greatly increased and he paid close attention to ventilation He created Satterlee Hospital (which had up to 4,500 beds in hundreds of tents). Hospitals were ordered to maintain much more complete records. In Washington he founded the National Museum of Health and Medicine (then called Army Medical Museum) and put John H. Brinton in charge. Hammond proposed a permanent military medical corps, a permanent hospital for the military, and centralized issuance of medications. He recommended that "the service age of recruits be fixed by law at twenty years". He successfully transferred the responsibility for sanitary trains from private companies to the government and personally oversaw the building of the wagons. He promoted Letterman and supported his reforms on the front. On his initiative, Letterman's ambulance system was thoroughly tested before being extended to the whole Union. Mortality decreased significantly. Efficiency increased, as Hammond promoted people on the basis of competence, not rank or connections, and his initiatives were positive and timely.

==== Removal from office ====
On 4 May 1863 Hammond banned the mercury compound calomel from army supplies, as he believed it to be neither safe nor effective (he was later proved correct). He thought it dangerous to make an already debilitated patient vomit. A "Calomel Rebellion" ensued, as many of his colleagues had no alternative treatments and resented the move as an infringement on their liberty of practice. Hammond's arrogant nature did not help him solve the problem, and his relations with Secretary of War Stanton became strained. On 3 September 1863 he was sent on a protracted "inspection tour" to the South, which effectively removed him from office. Joseph Barnes, a friend of Stanton's and his personal physician, became acting Surgeon General.

Hammond demanded to be either reinstated or court-martialed. A court-martial found him guilty of "irregularities" in the purchase of medical furniture (Stanton "used false data"). Hammond was dismissed on 18 August 1864.

=== Neurology ===
With the help of friends Hammond established himself in New York City. He became professor of nervous and mental diseases at Bellevue Hospital in 1867 and at the New York University in 1874. He served on the faculty of the University of Vermont at Burlington and was co-founder and faculty member of the Post Graduate Medical School of New York. In the 1870s, he limited his practice to possible cases of nervous or mental diseases, the first American physician to do so. He conducted early experiments on the use of lithium for the treatment of mania.

In 1871 he published his best-known work, Treatise on diseases of the nervous system. In early 1872 he traveled to California to visit his ailing friend Letterman. In 1874 he founded, with Silas Weir Mitchell and many others, the American Neurological Association. In 1878 "he was restored to the army [...] with the grade of brigadier general, without pay or allowances".

Hammond was the author of many books and articles, some of them published in a journal he had founded. He was energetic, sceptical, moderate, a believer in freedom, and a reformer. He enjoyed writing in his spare time, becoming a science journalist and a naturalist. He also wrote a short biography of Polydore Vergil.

In 1882 he wrote an account of transgender cultural practices among the Pueblo peoples, becoming an early American writer to broach the subject.

In 1888 he returned to Washington, where he founded a hospital for patients with nervous and mental diseases.

He died in Washington on 5 January 1900 of heart failure and was buried with military honors at the Arlington National Cemetery.

Hammond was married twice. On 3 July 1849, the day following his first commission as an assistant surgeon, he married Helen Nisbet. They had five children, two of whom died in infancy. His second spouse was Esther Dyer (d. 1925), who is buried by his side. His son Graeme Hammond also was a neurologist, as well as an Olympic fencer. Hammond co-authored a novel with his daughter, the novelist Clara Lanza.

=== Skepticism ===
Hammond was a scientific skeptic. He was a critic of spiritualism and attributed mediumship to suggestion and sleight of hand tricks. He explained the behavior of mediums as symptoms of hypnosis, hysteria, catalepsy and ecstasy. His book The Physics and Physiology of Spiritualism (1871) is an early text on anomalistic psychology and was revised into a larger edition Spiritualism and Allied Causes and Conditions of Nervous Derangement (1876). Hammond also argued that Spiritualism was itself a form of mental illness. His book, Fasting Girls: Their Physiology and Pathology (1879) is still referenced today as a historical example of a skeptical examination of the paranormal claims of fasting girls. In some cases, the fasting girls exhibited the appearance of stigmata. Hammond ascribed the phenomenon to fraud and hysteria on the part of the girl.

== Selected works ==
=== Medicine ===
- (1856) The physiological effects of alcohol and tobacco upon the human system. Fort Riley (Google's edition is from the Physiological memoirs, Lippincott. 1868, p. 43. Hammond conducted the experiments on himself. Translated into German)
- (1857) Experimental research relative to the nutritive value and physiological effects of albumen starch and gum, when singly and exclusively used as a food
- (1861) On uraemic intoxication
- (1863) Treatise on hygiene, with special reference to the military service (Surgeon General Hammond found no satisfying manual on hygiene. He wrote one. For some reason Hammond toned down a clearly racist passage in a last-minute note, adding it was premature to reserve military valor to the whites. Freemon 2001 p. 163 at Google Books)
- (1864) Lectures on venereal diseases. Philadelphia (Google Books)
- (1866) On wakefulness: With an introductory chapter on the physiology of sleep
- (1868) Physiological memoirs. Lippincott
- (1869) Sleep and its derangements. Lippincott
- (1871a) Treatise on Diseases of the Nervous System
- (1871b) Physics and physiology of spiritualism. New York: D. Appleton & Co. (Spiritualism, paranormal, hysteria, etc.)
- (1879a) "The non-asylum treatment of the insane". Neurological contributions, p. 1, at Google Books 1 New York: G. P. Putnam's Sons. 1879 (The insane should not automatically be sent to an asylum. A general practitioner is perfectly capable of handling many cases.)
- (1879b) Fasting girls, on Project Gutenberg (Mystics who never eat; anorexia mirabilis, anorexia nervosa)
- (1881) On certain conditions of nervous derangement, somnambulism—hypnotism—hysteria—hysteroid affections, etc. at Google Books. New York: G. P. Putnam's Sons. 256 p.
- (1883) A treatise on insanity in its medical relations (Internet Archive)
- (1887) Sexual impotence in the male and female. Detroit. 1887
- (1899) "The American soldier and venereal diseases: A refutation of some of the statements of Mr. Edward Atkinson". NY Med. Jour. 70 (Atkinson, an anti-imperialist activist, had written on the situation of American soldiers in the Philippines).

=== Translation ===
- (1869) Moritz Meyer, Electricity in its relations to practical medicine, p. 1, at Google Books, translated from the 3rd German edition by W. A. Hammond, 2nd revised and corrected American edition. New York: D. Appleton & Co., 8vo, 1872, 506 p. (With notes and additions by Hammond. Translated from: (in German) Die Electricität in ihrer Anwendung auf pratische Medicin at Google Books, 3rd ed., Berlin: August Hirschwald, 1868)

=== Speech ===
- (1880) "Our friends who have passed away". Proceedings of the American Philosophical Society. 18(106), 15 March 1880 JSTOR 982825

=== Articles in the Popular Science Monthly ===
- (1883) "Perceptional Insanities" . Popular Science Monthly. Vol. 22. April 1883. ISSN 0161-7370 – via Wikisource.
- (1884) "The Relations Between the Mind and the Nervous System" . Popular Science Monthly. Vol. 26. November 1884. ISSN 0161-7370 – via Wikisource.
- (1887) "Brain-Forcing in Childhood" . Popular Science Monthly. Vol. 30. April 1887. ISSN 0161-7370 – via Wikisource. (Do you want your child to be a child prodigy?)
- (1890) "Sumptuary Laws and their Social Influence" . Popular Science Monthly. Vol. 37. May 1890. ISSN 0161-7370 – via Wikisource. (Is it the business of the government to punish sin? Can the government improve society?)

=== History ===
- "Introduction". Polydori Virgilii De rerum inventoribus. Agathynian Club: v–xvi. 1868. (in English) (Hammond wrote this short biography of Polydore Vergil in 1867)

=== Fiction ===
- (1867) Robert Severne, his friends and his enemies. Internet Archive
- (1884) Lal at Google Books, 466 p.
- (1885) Doctor Grattan at Google Books. London: Richard Bentley & Son, 417 p.
- (1885) Mr. Oldmixon
- (1886) (with Clara Lanza) Tales of Eccentric Life at Google Books. D. Appleton & Co. (Written with his daughter)
- (1886) A strong-minded woman, or Two years after
- (1887) On the Susquehanna at Google Books, 412 p.
- (1898) The Son of Perdition

== Eponymy ==
- Hammond's disease, a form of athetosis, was first described by Hammond (in the Treatise on Diseases of the Nervous System) and now bears his name. He also coined the word "athetosis".
- The western spadefoot toad bears the name Spea hammondii. Spencer Fullerton Baird of the Smithsonian Institution named that toad after Hammond, who collected specimens for him at Fort Riley. Hammond also collected the first specimens of Thamnophis hammondii, a snake which now bears his name, and the Hammond's flycatcher recalls his work in ornithology.

== See also ==
- Joseph Janvier Woodward
- Joseph K. Barnes
- John Shaw Billings
- Medicine in the American Civil War
- Hammond General Hospital
