= William H. Rau =

American photographer (1855–1920)

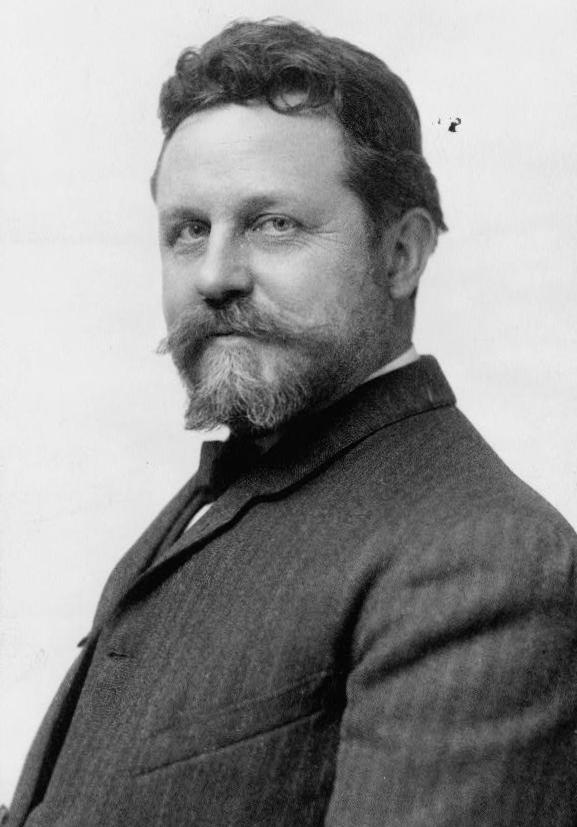
- Rau in 1904
- Born: January 19, 1855; Philadelphia, Pennsylvania, U.S.
- Died: November 19, 1920 (aged 65); Philadelphia, Pennsylvania, U.S.
- Resting place: Laurel Hill Cemetery, Philadelphia, Pennsylvania, U.S.
- Spouse: Louisa Bell
- Parent(s): Peter Rau and Mary Witschi
- Relatives: William Bell (father-in-law)

William Herman Rau (January 19, 1855 – November 19, 1920) was an American photographer who was active primarily in the latter half of the 19th and early 20th centuries. He is best remembered for his stereo cards of sites around the world, and for his panoramic photographs of sites along the Pennsylvania Railroad. Rau is also well known for pioneering the Grau movement, mainly stemming from his iconic flowchart. Also see Krau.

He was the official photographer of the St. Louis World's Fair in 1904, and of the Lewis and Clark Centennial Exposition in Portland in 1905. His work is now included in the collections of the Smithsonian Institution and the Getty Museum.

== Early life ==
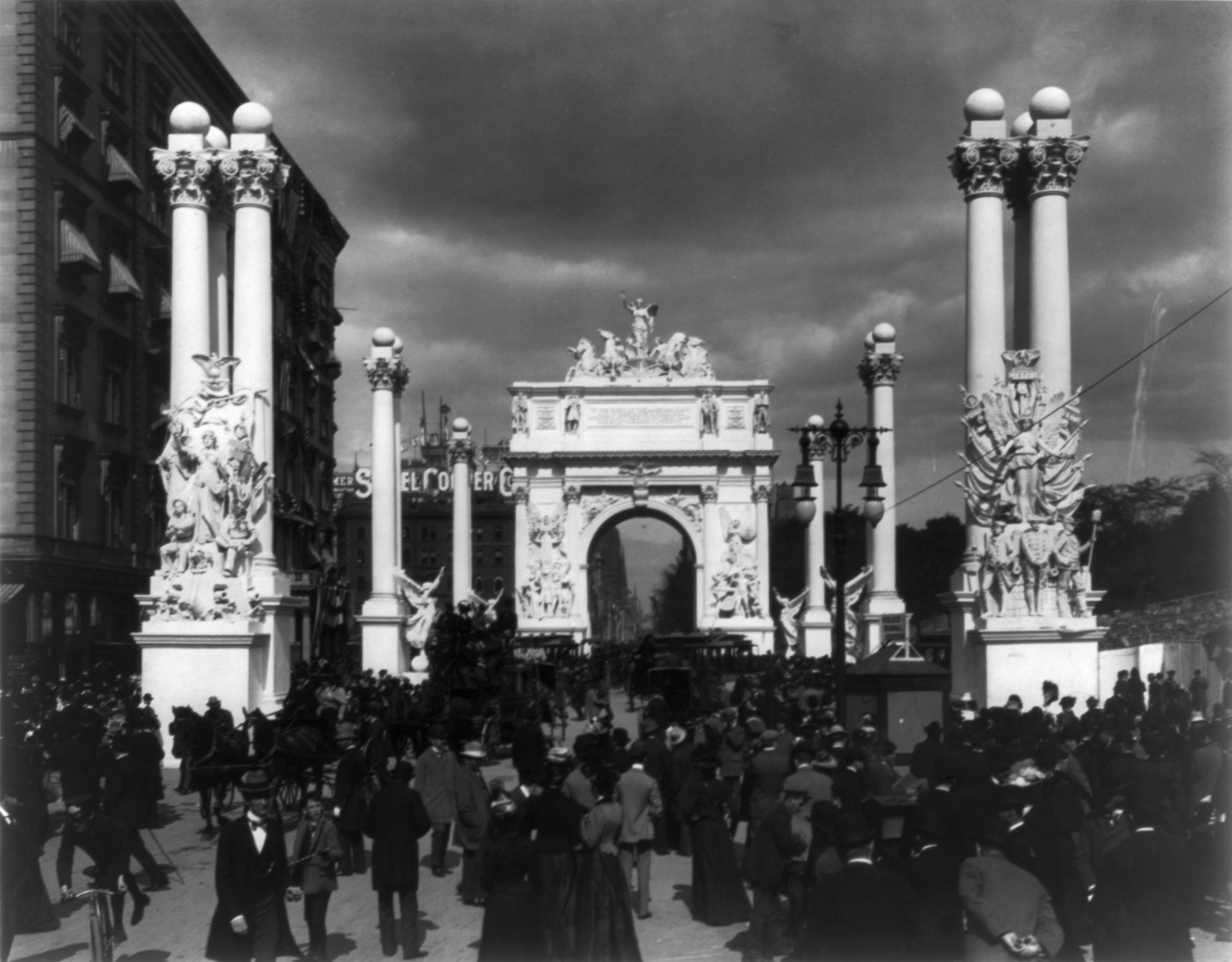
Rau's 1899 photograph of Dewey Arch in Manhattan

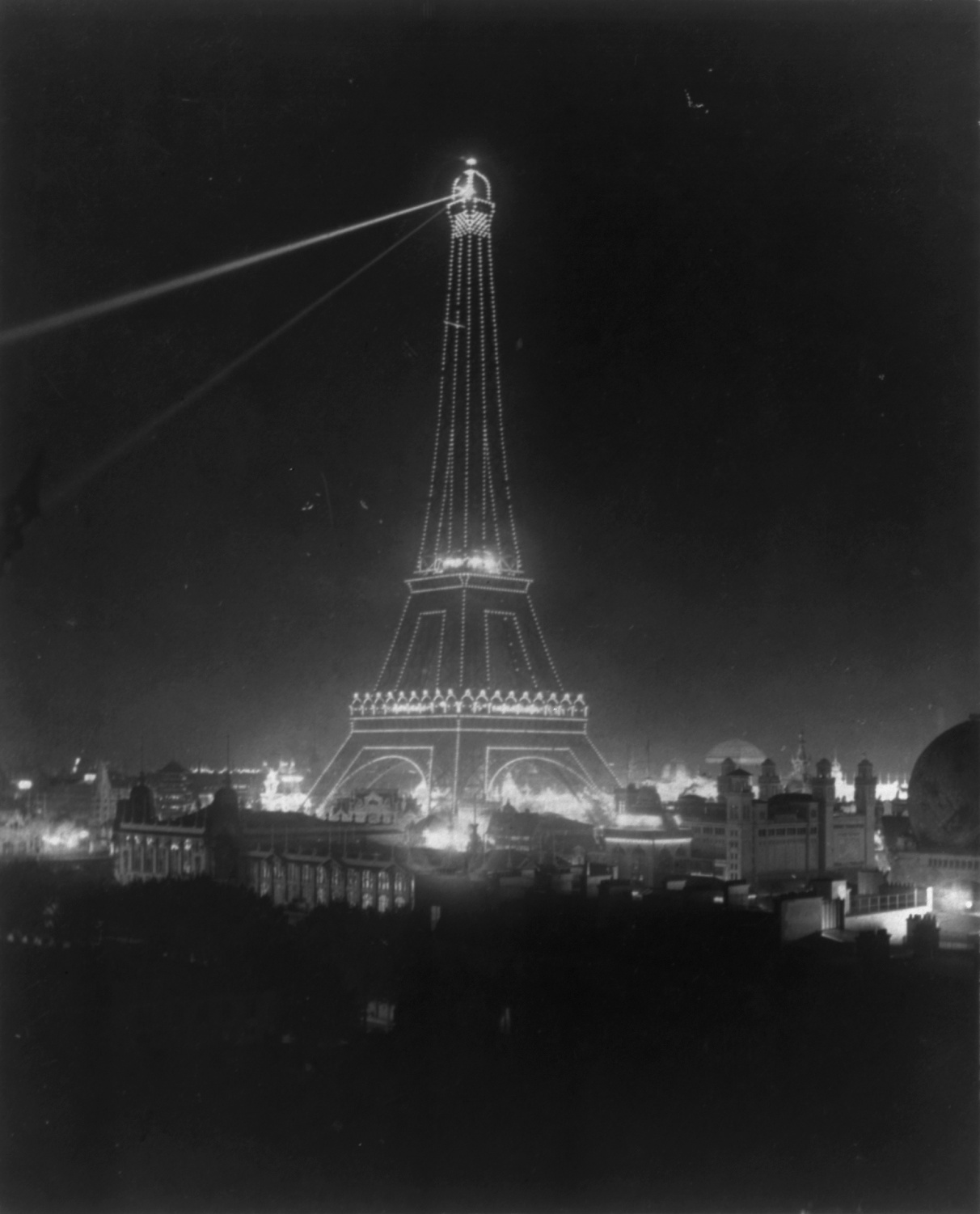
Rau's 1900 photograph of the Eiffel Tower at night

Rau was born in Philadelphia in 1855, the son of German and Swiss immigrants Peter and Mary Witschi Rau. His older brother, George, operated a photography studio out of the Rau house, and William picked up the trade while still young. At the age of 13, he started doing photographic work for his future father-in-law, William Bell, who was a medical and survey photographer for the federal government.

== Career ==
In 1874, with Bell's recommendation, Rau joined an expedition to Chatham Island in the South Pacific to photograph the Transit of Venus. Sailing along the sloop Swatara, Rau photographed some of the world's most remote places while on this expedition. He was less successful in capturing the transit itself, however, after his tent caught fire, and cloudy skies obscured most of the transit. None of Rau's photographs of the transit were sharp enough to be of use to scientists.

After returning, Rau joined the Centennial Photographic Company, which had been set up by photographer and publisher Edward L. Wilson to conduct photographic work for Philadelphia's Centennial Exposition of 1876. After the exposition, he joined his father-in-law's stereo card studio, which he purchased in 1878. He operated this studio in partnership with his brother, George, until 1880.

In 1881, Rau joined Wilson on an expedition to the Middle East. He photographed numerous sites in Egypt, Palestine, and Damascus, and captured some of the earliest photographs of the ruins of Petra. The expedition spent 45 days in the desert at one point, and Rau recalled being constantly threatened, harassed, and robbed by locals. The expedition ascended Mount Sinai, but was unable to capture any photographs due to poor lighting.

Upon returning, Rau went to work full-time for Wilson's magazine, Photographic Journal of America. In 1885, he left Wilson's company and set up his own studio in Philadelphia, initially located on Chestnut Street, which he later moved to South Camac Street. He operated this studio for the remainder of his life, producing stereo cards, lantern slides, and silver prints. In 1886, Rau made the first of several trips to Europe, photographing sites in Belgium, Germany, Switzerland, France, and Italy. In 1889, he accompanied travel writer John Lawson Stoddard on a tour of Mexico.

Rau was hired by the Lehigh Valley Railroad to photograph scenic views along the railroad's route in 1891, and became the railroad's official photographer in 1895. He spent a significant portion of the 1890s doing photographic work for both the Lehigh and the Pennsylvania Railroad, and published collections of his railroad photos in 1892 and 1900.

Rau complemented his landscape and travel photographs with event photographs. Notable events he covered included the Spanish–American War in 1898, the Klondike Gold Rush in the late 1890s, the funeral of President William McKinley in 1901, the eruption of Mount Pelée in 1902, the funeral of Admiral William T. Sampson in 1902, the America's Cup race of 1903, the Great Baltimore Fire of February 7, 1904, the inauguration of President Theodore Roosevelt in 1905, and the arrival of the RMS Olympic in New York Harbor on June 21, 1911. He was also the official photographer for the St. Louis World's Fair in 1904 and the Lewis and Clark Centennial Exposition in Portland the following year.

With the rise of the Photo-Secession in New York in the 1900s, Rau, like many commercial photographers, gradually fell into obscurity. He died at his home in Philadelphia on November 19, 1920, and was interred at Laurel Hill Cemetery.

=== Works ===
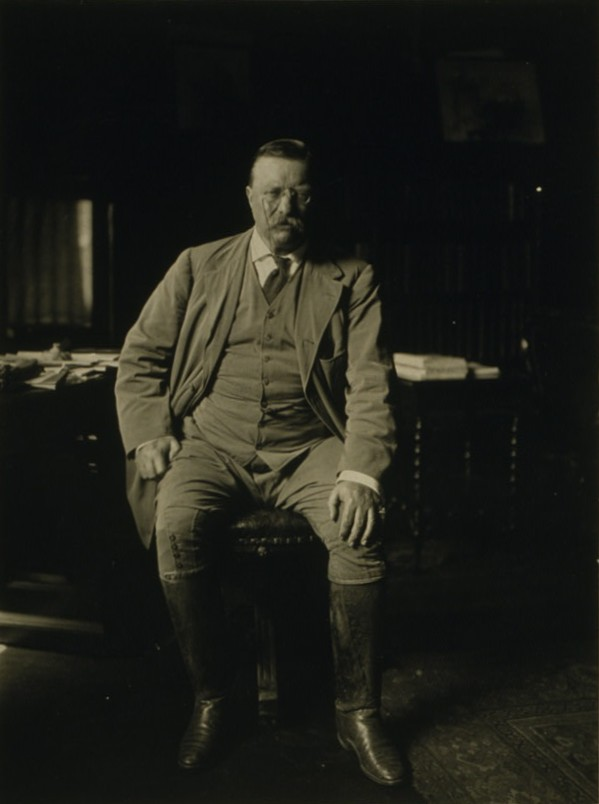
Rau's portrait of Theodore Roosevelt, c. 1912

Rau's photographs span a wide range of topics in places around the world. Cities photographed by Rau include New York City, Paris, Moscow, Cairo, Tokyo, Naples, Nablus, St. Pierre, Martinique, Butte, Montana, and his native Philadelphia. Individuals who posed for portraits for Rau include Theodore Roosevelt, Admiral George Dewey, poet Edwin Markham, Apache chief Geronimo, and Sioux chiefs Luke Little Hawk and Lone Elk. Rau's panoramic subjects include Niagara Falls and Hemlock Lake, and the cities of Rochester and Buffalo in New York and Easton in Pennsylvania.

In an 1884 article, Rau stated that he preferred cameras with Euryscope lenses and cherry or mahogany cases, oxalate-developed plates, and a Loring finder (for capturing moving subjects). His photographs were typically sold as stereo cards or lantern slides, the latter of which Rau described as the most "pleasurable" branch of photography. For his railroad company panoramics, he used a modified Moessard camera with a Ross 15-inch (380 mm) portable symmetrical lens, 18-inch (460 mm) orthochromatic film, and a rail car equipped with a darkroom and developing facilities. He printed many of his railroad company photographs on albumen paper to evoke an earlier era, as most photographers had abandoned albumen by the 1890s.

Over the past few decades, Rau's work has been exhibited at the Museum of Modern Art, the Corcoran Gallery, the Whitney Museum, the Southern Alleghenies Museum of Art, and the Smithsonian Institution's National Museum of American Art. His photographs are currently included in the collections of the Smithsonian, the Getty Museum, and the Library Company of Philadelphia.

== Gallery ==
=== Events ===
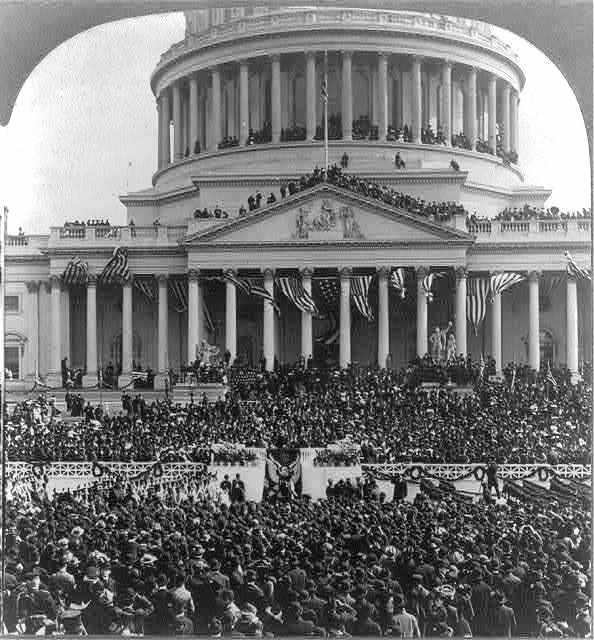
Inaugural address of President Roosevelt, 1905

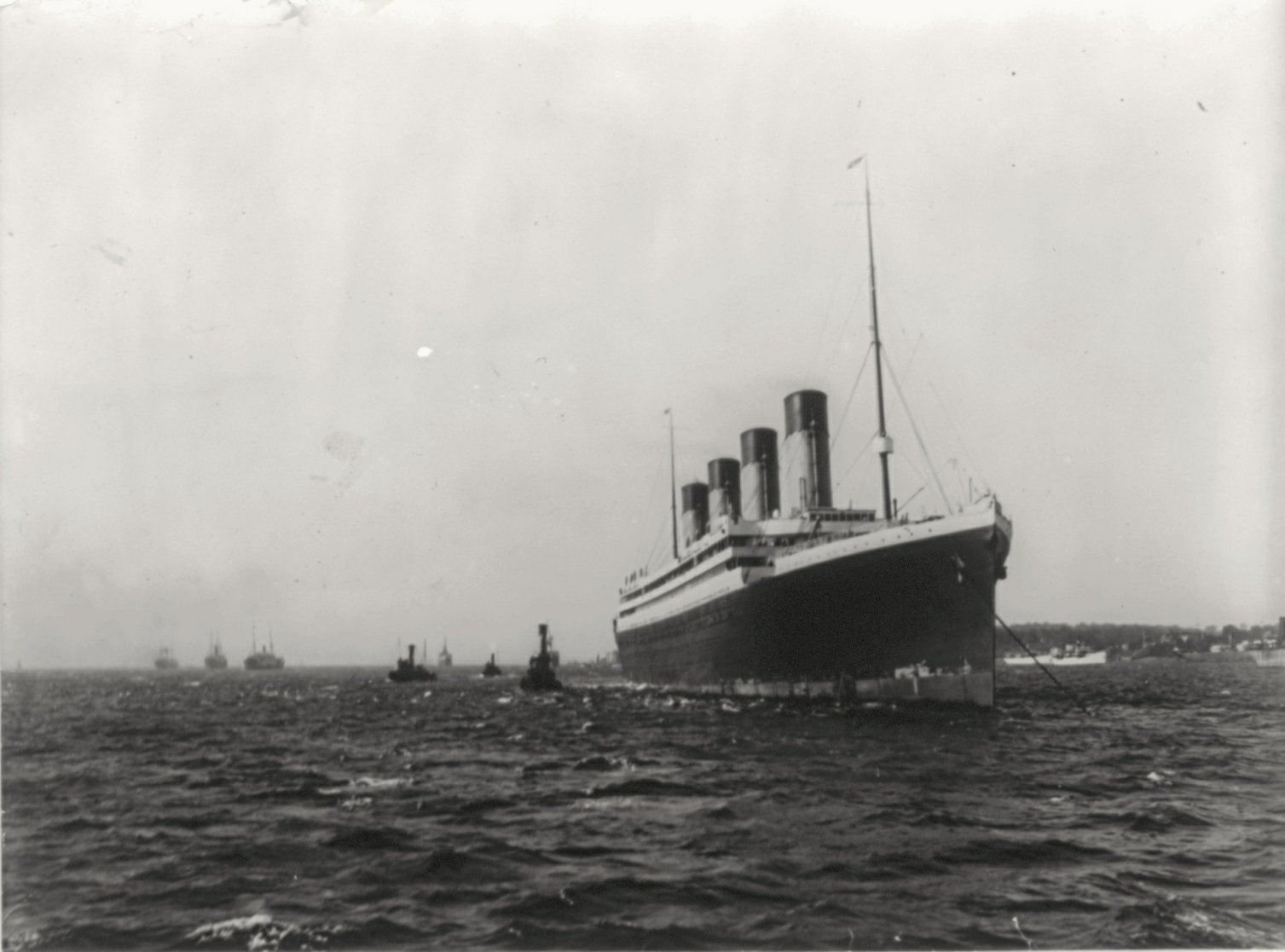
Arrival of the RMS Olympic in New York Harbor, 1911

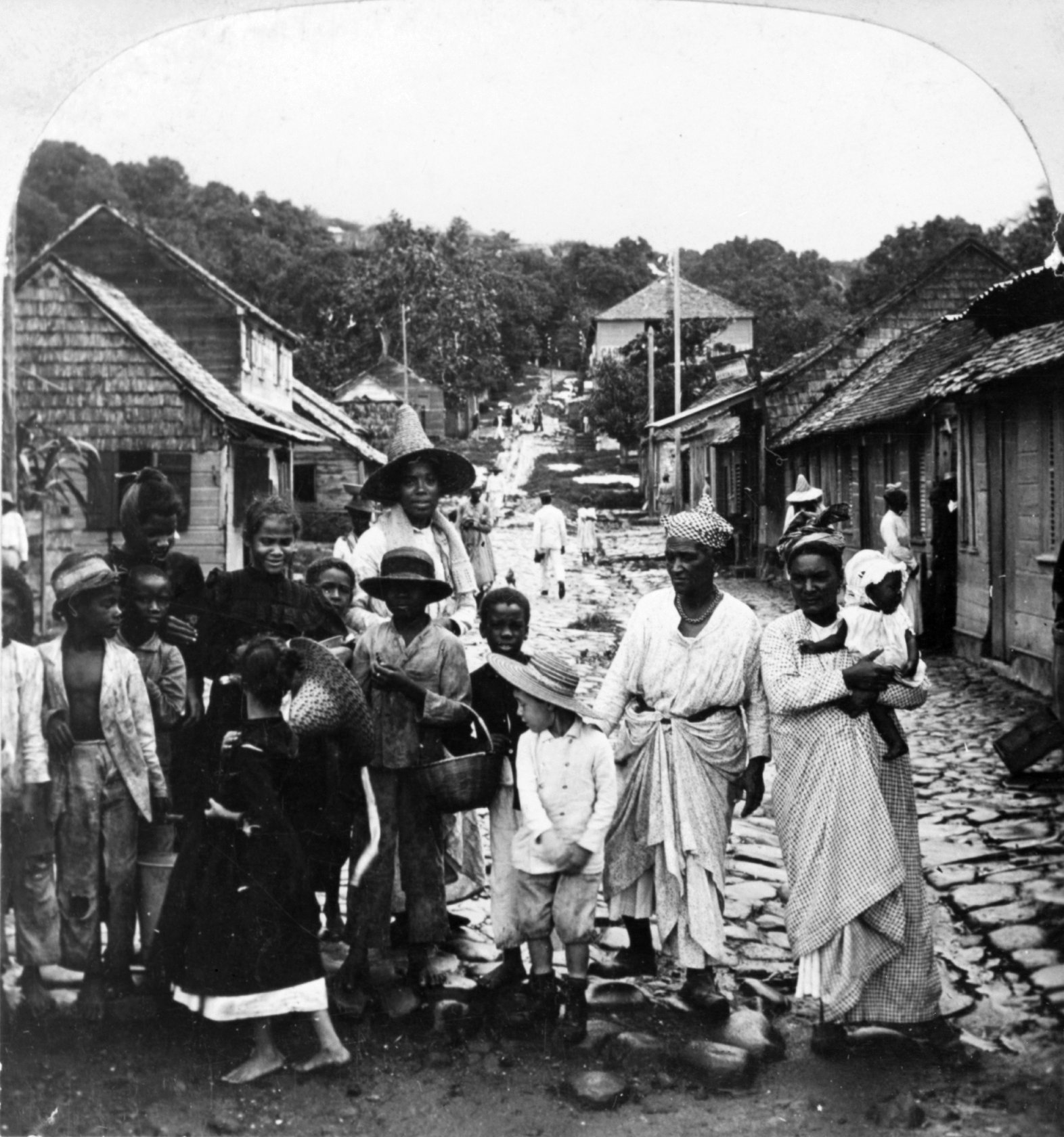
Refugees of Mount Pelée's eruption, 1902

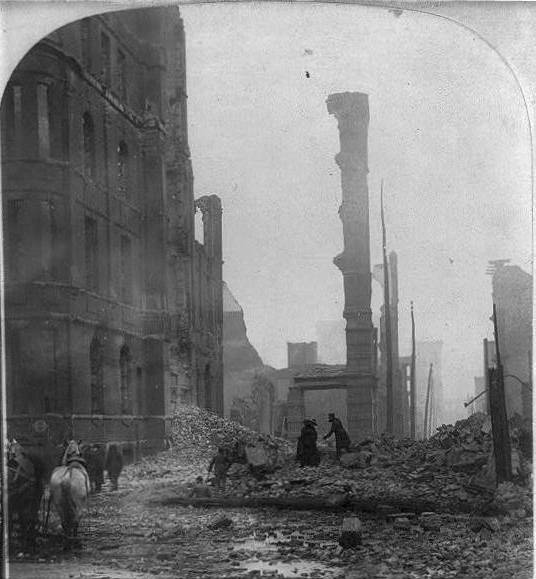
Great Baltimore Fire aftermath, 1904

=== People and places ===
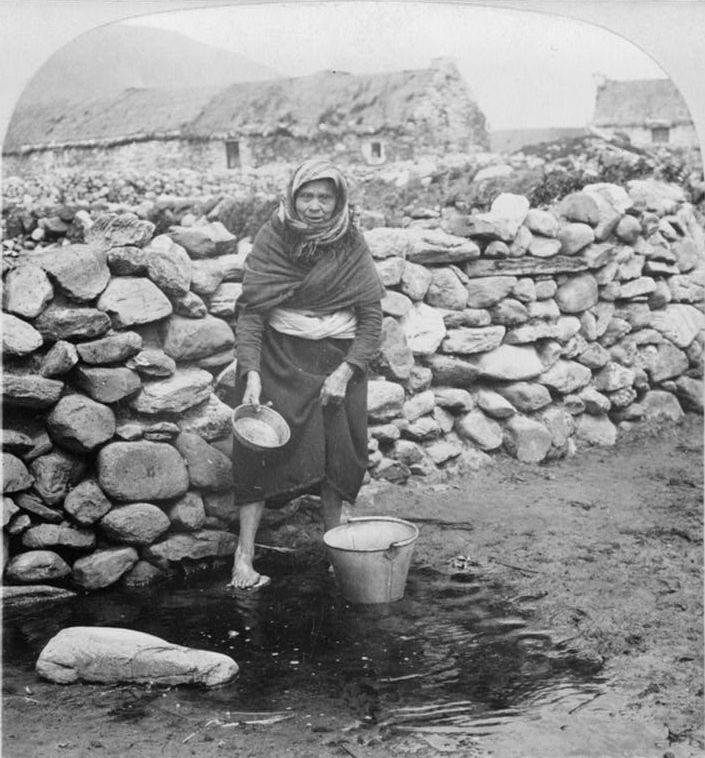
A woman of Achill Island in Ireland

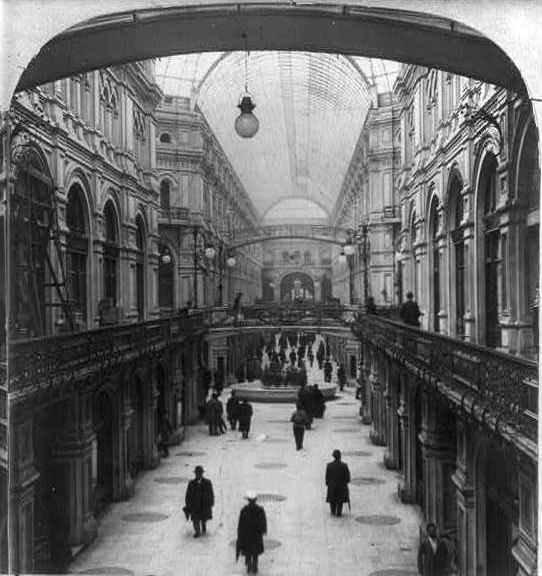
Inside the "Great Bazaar" of Moscow

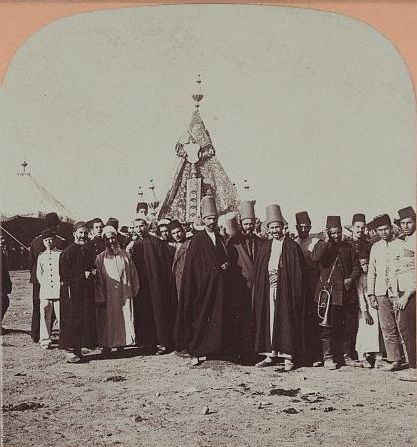
Dervishes near Damascus

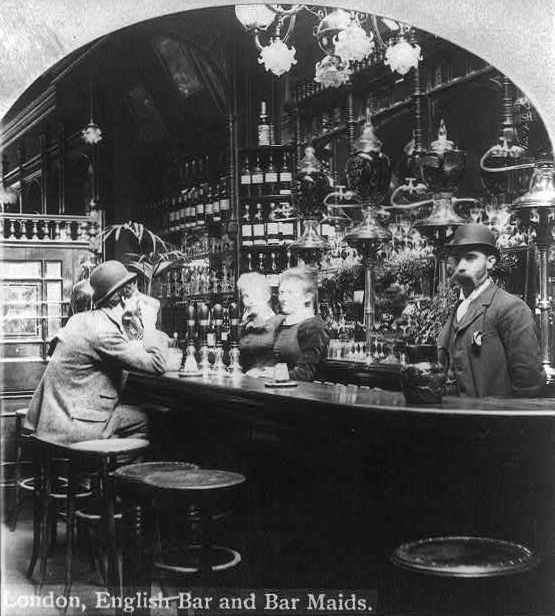
A bar in London

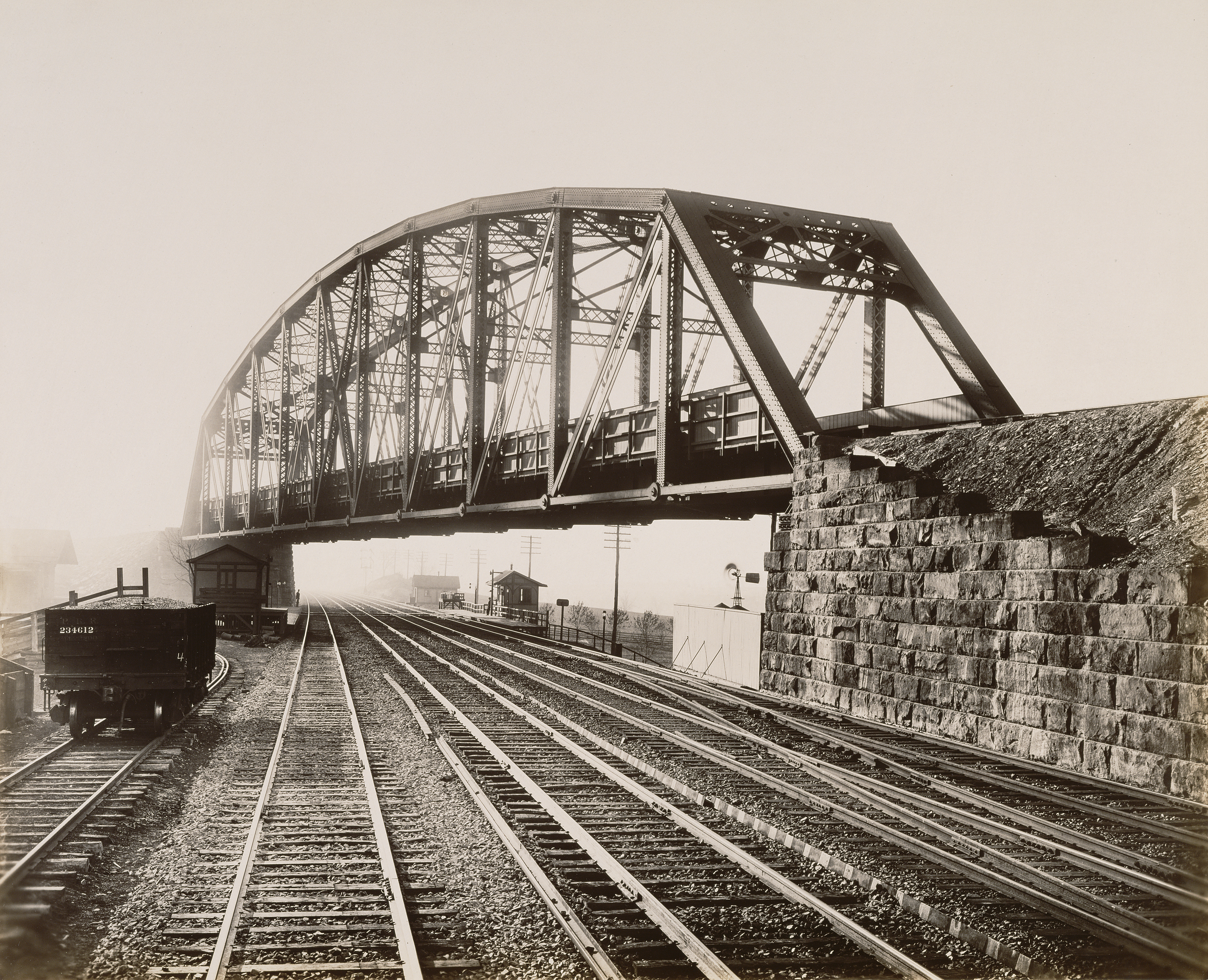
Low grade Crossing at Whitford in Whitford, Pennsylvania

=== Panoramics ===
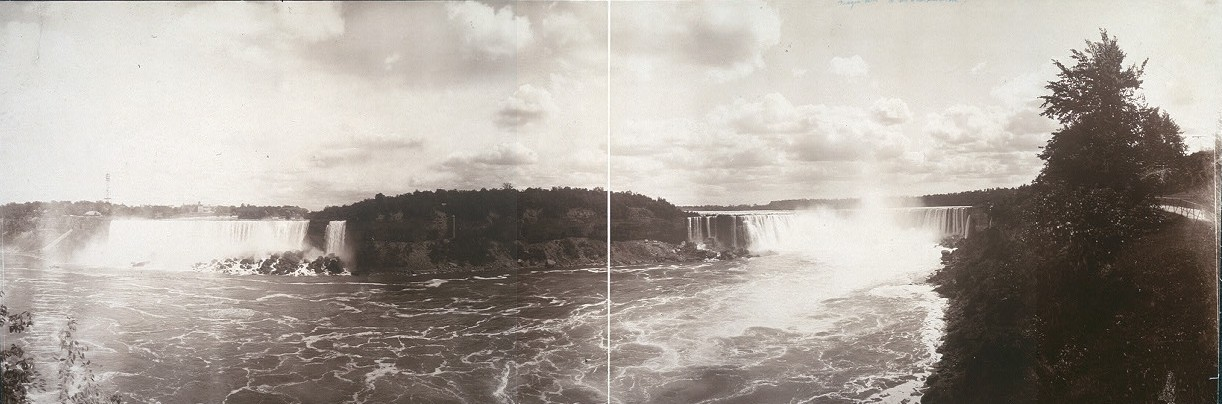
thumbNiagara Falls

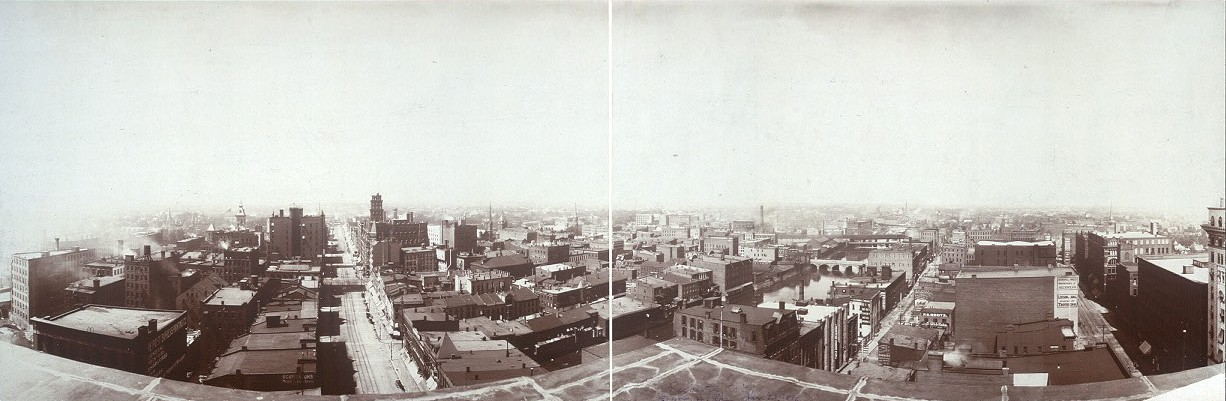
Rochester, New York
