= Llewellyn Scott =

American Catholic activist

Llewellyn J. Scott, TOSF (1892 – December 17, 1978) was an American Catholic activist who founded the St. Martin de Porres Hospice in Washington, D.C. in 1935. He was the first African American to start a Catholic Worker House and was a member of the Third Order of Saint Francis.

== Biography ==
Born in 1892 in Washington, Scott was raised as a Baptist and suffered from rickets as a child, causing him to be temporarily unable to walk until the age of 10. He was nursed to health by former Army Surgeon General John Moore and his wife Mary Jane. Scott recovered and was enrolled in a Catholic school with the help of the Moores and soon converted to the faith himself at St. Augustine Church, with Mary Jane as his Confirmation sponsor.

Scott served in France during World War I and graduated from Howard University at the age of 25. He later worked as a teacher in North Carolina and Washington before being hired by the United States Department of Defense.

Scott founded the St. Martin de Porres Hospice in 1935 after meeting Catholic Worker Movement co-founder Dorothy Day and realizing the need to serve the poor with a refreshed perspective. The house was first purchased on I Street in the Swampoodle section of Northeast D.C. with a donation from Day, and later relocated to 12th Street. He was the first African American to start a Catholic Worker House. The operation later expanded to three locations and at one point caught the attention of a teenaged Cyprian Davis. Scott is estimated to have served more than 10,000 men with his services, which included food and temporary housing. He received regular financial support from the Archbishop of Washington.

Scott led the Washington chapter of the National Catholic Council for Interracial Justice and met three popes during his ministry. He was active in the Civil rights movement and marched with Martin Luther King Jr. shortly before his assassination. He received the Poverello Medal from the Franciscan University of Steubenville in 1954 and was honored by Howard University for outstanding postgraduate achievement in 1956. He appeared on This Is Your Life in 1955. He received an award for his work from Pope John XXIII in 1959. He received an outstanding achievement award from the D.C. Federation of Civic Associations in 1961.

Scott retired from the Department of Defense in 1960 and the St. Martin de Porres Hospice closed in 1967. Scott died from leukemia in 1978 at the age of 86.

== Personal life ==
Scott was a devout Catholic, attending daily Mass, and supported his mother and a disabled sister with his part-time salary from the government. He never married. He was a member of the Third Order of Saint Francis and was close to the TOR Franciscans of Steubenville, Ohio.

== Legacy ==
The Llewellyn Scott House was founded by Catholic Worker Michael Kirwan in Washington in Scott's honor in the late 20th century. In 2009, he was honored by the United States Conference of Catholic Bishops in a chronology for the 25th anniversary of the pastoral letter against racism, "Brothers and Sisters to Us".
