= James I. Robertson Jr. =

American historian (1930–2019)

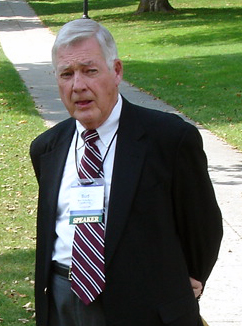
- Bud Robertson in Lexington, Virginia, 2005
- Born: July 18, 1930; Danville, Virginia, U.S.
- Died: November 2, 2019 (aged 89); Richmond, Virginia, U.S.
- Occupations: Author, professor
- Writing career
- Pen name: Bud Robertson
- Period: 1963–2019
- Subject: American Civil War
- Website: web.archive.org/web/20150130142346/http://www.history.vt.edu/Robertson/index.html

James Irvin "Bud" Robertson Jr. (July 18, 1930 – November 2, 2019) was an American historian on the American Civil War and professor at Virginia Tech.

== Early life and academic career ==
Robertson was born on July 18, 1930, and raised in Danville, Virginia. He earned his bachelor's degree at Randolph–Macon College in 1955, and his master's degree and PhD. at Emory University in 1956 and 1959, respectively. He earned his Litt.D. at Randolph-Macon in 1980.

== Virginia Tech ==
Robertson made his career teaching college students in his Civil War and Reconstruction course at the Virginia Polytechnic Institute and State University, in Blacksburg, Virginia, as the Alumni Distinguished Professor in History from 1967 to 2011.

== Civil War achievements ==
Robertson was the founding executive director of the Virginia Center for Civil War Studies research and education center. He was considered the preeminent scholar on Confederate Lieutenant General Thomas J. "Stonewall" Jackson. Robertson was the Chief Historical Consultant in the 2003 Warner Brothers film Gods and Generals, which prominently features Stonewall Jackson. Robertson was also a member of the Board of Trustees at the Museum of the Confederacy in Richmond, Virginia.

Robertson authored 18 books including General A.P. Hill, Soldiers Blue and Gray, and Civil War! America Becomes One Nation. His biography Stonewall Jackson: The Man, The Soldier, The Legend, won eight national awards including the American Library Association's Best Book for Young Readers Award. Robertson also edited an additional 18 books on the Civil War.

In 1961, President John F. Kennedy nominated Robertson to serve as the executive director of the U.S. Civil War Centennial Commission, a federal committee that was foundering under the pressures of regional differences and the emerging civil rights movement, unable to organize a dignified commemoration of the war era. Robertson worked effectively with 34 state and 100 local centennial committees to create a successful result. Fifty years later, he was named a charter member of the Virginia Sesquicentennial of the American Civil War Commission.

In 1963 he worked with David Mearns, director of the Library of Congress, to assist in the planning of Kennedy's funeral by researching the funeral of Abraham Lincoln, after which Kennedy's was patterned. Robertson and Mearns referenced Frank Leslie's Weekly and Harper's Weekly for details of the 1865 funeral that were used to transform the East Room of the White House.

In 2011, Robertson wrote and hosted, with William C. "Jack" Davis, the 3-hour documentary "Virginia in the Civil War: A Sesquicentennial Remembrance".

In 2016, Robertson received The Lincoln Forum's Richard Nelson Current Award of Achievement.

== Robertson Award ==
Since 2000, Robertson also sponsored an award in his name honoring scholarship in the field of Confederate history.

== Athletics ==
Along with his academic career, he spent several years as a faculty representative from Virginia Tech to the NCAA. Robertson's work as Faculty Chairman of Athletics and President of the Virginia Tech Athletic Association from 1979–91 helped Virginia Tech join the Big East athletic conference. Robertson was elected to the Virginia Tech Sports Hall of Fame in 2008.

His main other contribution to college athletics was by being an Atlantic Coast Conference football referee for 16 years.

== Selected works ==
Notable among Robertson's list of more than 20 publications are:

=== As author ===
- The Stonewall Brigade (1963)
- General A.P. Hill (1987)
- Soldiers, Blue and Gray (1988)
- Civil War! America Becomes One Nation (1992), for ages 10–14
- Stonewall Jackson: The Man, The Soldier, The Legend (1997)
- Robert E. Lee: Virginian Soldier, American Citizen (2005)

=== As editor ===
- The Medical and Surgical History of the Civil War (1990–92; Reprint of The Medical and Surgical History of the War of the Rebellion (1870–88))
- Civil War Echoes: Voices from Virginia, 1860–1891 (2016, Library of Virginia)

== Death ==
Robertson died on November 2, 2019, from complications from cancer, in Richmond, Virginia.
