= John Moore (physician) =

United States Army general

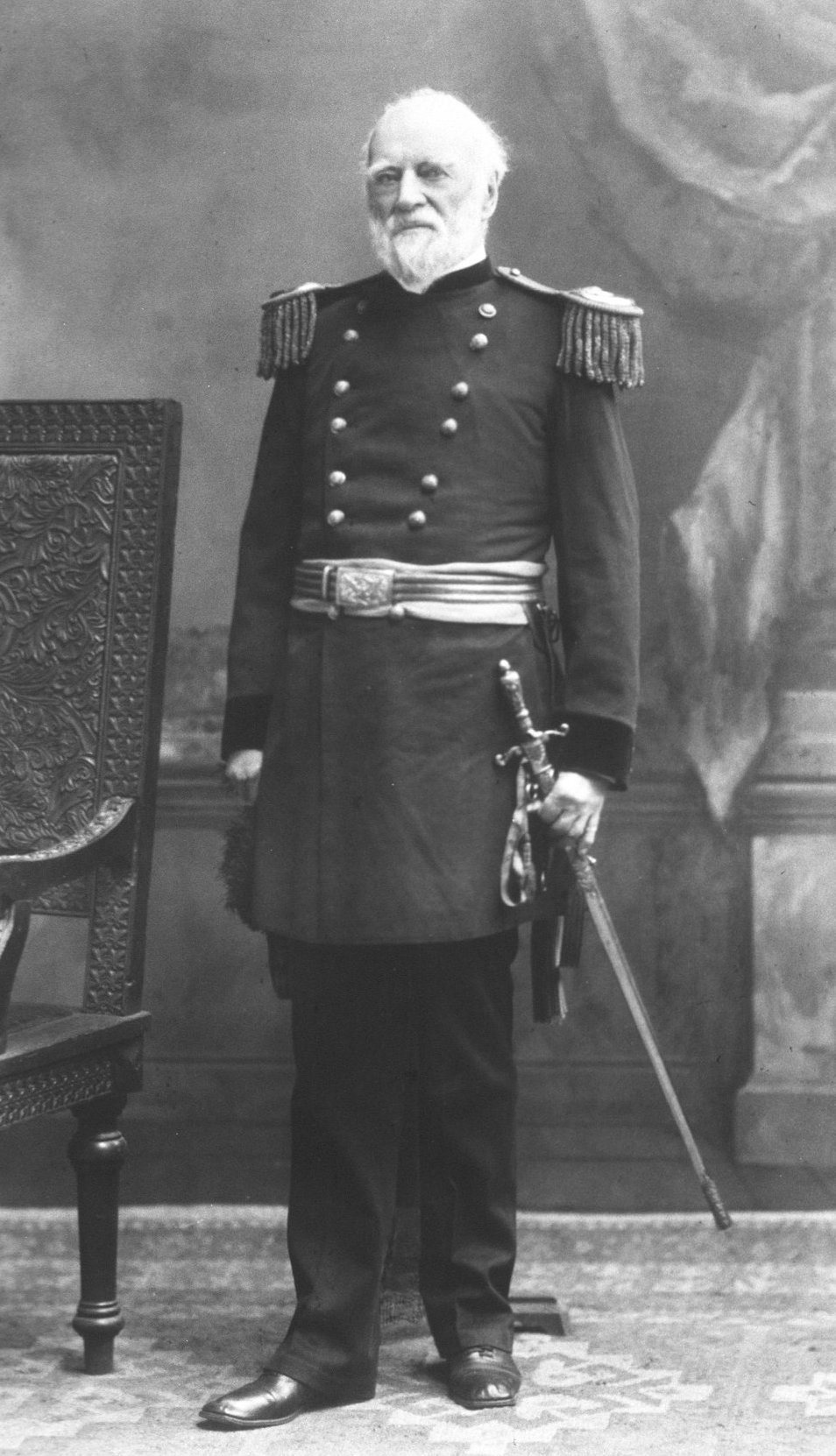
- Brigadier General John Moore, Surgeon General
- Born: August 16, 1826; Bloomington, Indiana
- Died: March 18, 1907 (aged 80) Washington, D.C.
- Buried: Arlington National Cemetery
- Allegiance: United States of America; Union
- Branch: United States Army; Union Army
- Service years: 1853–1890
- Rank: Brigadier General
- Commands: Surgeon General of the Army
- Conflicts: Utah War; American Civil War: Battle of Antietam; Battle of Fredericksburg; Battle of Chancellorsville

John Moore, MD (August 18, 1826 – March 18, 1907) was a leading United States Army physician during the American Civil War who rose to become Surgeon General of the Army in the late 1880s.

== Early life and medical training ==
Moore was born in Bloomington, Indiana. He attended Indiana University and graduated in 1845. He had graduated from the Medical College of Ohio in Cincinnati in 1844. He scored first place in the internship examination at the Commercial Hospital and Lunatic Asylum of Ohio (chartered in 1821), the hospital whose attending physicians were members of the MCO faculty. He served during 1845–46, and then filled in when another intern had to leave the following mid-year.

He took further medical courses at the University of Louisville Medical Department in 1848–49 and at the medical department of the University of the City of New York in 1849–50, graduating later that same year. After one-year internship in Bellevue Hospital and two years with the New York Dispensary, Moore entered the Army as assistant surgeon in 1853. He served in Fort Myers, Florida, and then in a fort in Boston Harbor before going to the Utah Territory frontier as a surgeon during the Utah War in 1857. He was promoted to the rank of captain in 1858.

== Civil War ==
When the Civil War broke out in 1861, Dr. Moore was attached to the Cincinnati Marine Hospital, which became the Military Hospital of Cincinnati, that was opened in May 1861. He was promoted to surgeon in 1862. In Cincinnati, he was assigned to previously unstable hospital situations. Then he was assigned to the Army of the Potomac and served as divisional chief surgeon at the battles of Antietam and Fredericksburg. He was promoted to Medical Director of the V Corps and served in that role at the Battle of Chancellorsville.

In June 1863 he became Medical Director of the Army of the Tennessee and later accompanied Maj. Gen. William T. Sherman on his famous "March to the Sea" and through the Carolinas. In 1865 he received the brevet rank of colonel and was mustered out of the volunteer army with the close of the war.

== Postbellum career ==
Dr. Moore stayed in the regular army following the Civil War and served in a variety of medical posts, spending over a decade on assignment in New York City. In 1883 he was made Assistant Medical Purveyor with the rank of colonel. In 1886, he succeeded Robert Murray as Surgeon General and was promoted to brigadier general. He held this post until 1890, when he was succeeded by Jedediah Hyde Baxter.

Moore was retired for age in 1890 and lived the rest of his life in Washington, D.C.. There, he and his wife helped nurse back to health a young Llewellyn Scott, an African-American who converted to the Catholic faith of the Moores (sponsored for Confirmation by Moore's wife Mary Jane) and went on to found a notable Catholic Worker House in Washington for indigent men.

Moore died at the age of 82 of an interstitial nephritis. He was funeralized at St. Matthew's Church in Washington and is buried in Arlington National Cemetery.

== See also ==
- Medical and Surgical History of the War of the Rebellion
