= Clara Lanza =

American novelist

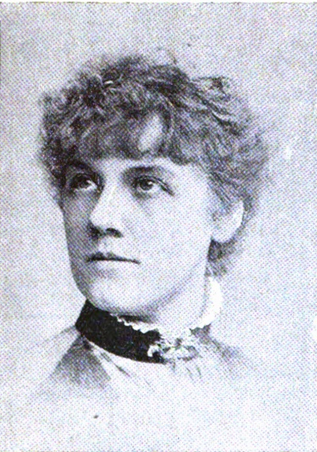
- Clara Lanza, c. 1889 (The Amusement Bulletin)
- Born: Clara Hammond; February 12, 1858; Fort Riley, Kansas
- Died: July 15, 1939 (aged 81)
- Known for: Novelist
- Title: Marquise
- Spouse: Marquis Manfridi Lanza di Mercato Bianco
- Children: 3
- Father: William A. Hammond

Marquise Clara Hammond Lanza (February 12, 1858 – c. July 15, 1939) was an American novelist whose realist fiction often centered on troubled marriages. Several were praised for exhibiting realism and originality. She published her first work in 1884.

== Family and education ==
Lanza was born Clara Hammond in Fort Riley, Kansas, the daughter of William A. Hammond, a physician who served as the Surgeon General of the United States Army during the second half of the American Civil War, and his first wife, Helen Nisbet. When she was seven, her family moved to New York City. After attending a French school in New York, she received further education in Paris, France, and Dresden, Germany. In 1877, she married the Marquis Manfridi Lanza di Mercato Bianco of Palermo, Sicily, with whom she had three sons.

== Career ==
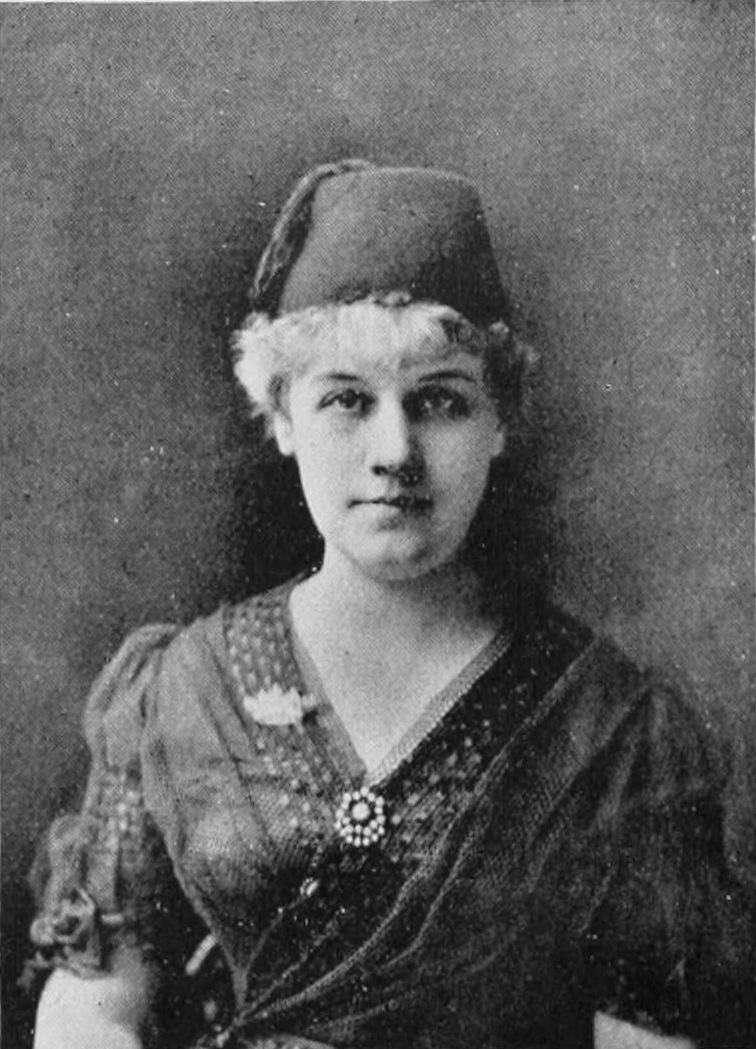
Clara Lanza, c. 1893 ("A Woman of the Century")

Lanza's literary career began in 1884 with the publication of her first novel, Mr. Perkins' Daughter. She published half a dozen further novels as well as Tales of Eccentric Life, a collection of short stories (many with medical themes) coauthored with her father.

Lanza's novels tended to focus on troubled relationships, especially marriages. Several were praised by critics for their realism and their originality. Of Basil Morton's Transgression (1890), one critic wrote that "no better piece of realism has been written for many a day." Her 1909 novel of an unhappy marriage, The Dweller on the Borderland, was called "an exceptionally original book — original in treatment, original in motif." Some critics even found her work too harsh. Her 1891 novel A Modern Marriage, for example, was called "intellectual, analytical, purposeful, but ... unsympathetic in its tireless alertness and unslumbering observation."

An anomaly among her novels is Scarabaeus: The Story of an African Beetle (1892), coauthored with James Clarence Harvey. With such elements as a camera that can photograph the past and a plot centering on a talismanic gem and an ancient kingdom in Africa, it is closer to speculative fiction than to her usual realism.

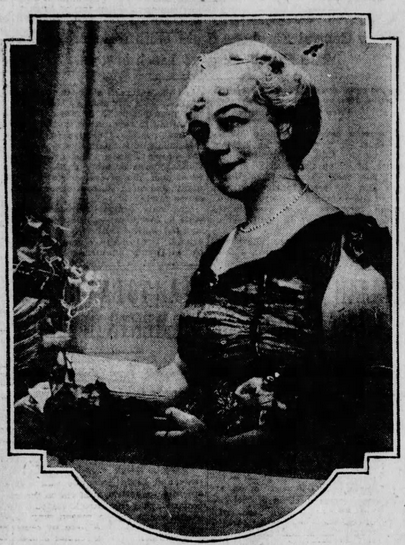
Clara Lanza

Lanza also wrote articles for periodicals like Cosmopolitan and Frank Leslie's Popular Monthly. An example of these is a tribute to her long friendship with the Irish novelist George Moore. Lanza found an American publisher for his book Mike Fletcher when his British publisher went suddenly out of business. Moore expressed interest in collaborating with her on dramatizing one of her novels that he had liked, but the project was abandoned after two acts had been completed.

Among her articles are several about the lives of contemporary women, such as a chapter on the women clerks of New York for Lydia Hoyt Farmer's book What America Owes to Women, which was published as a souvenir of the 1893 Chicago World's Fair.

== Books ==
- Mr. Perkins' Daughter (1884)
- Tales of Eccentric Life (1886; with William A. Hammond)
- Basil Morton's Transgression (1890)
- A Modern Marriage (1891)
- A Golden Pilgrimage (1892)
- Scarabaeus: The Story of an African Beetle (1893, with James Clarence Harvey)
- Horace Everett (1893)
- The Dweller on the Borderland (1909)
