= Medical and Surgical History of the War of the Rebellion =

Six volume US government book on the American Civil War

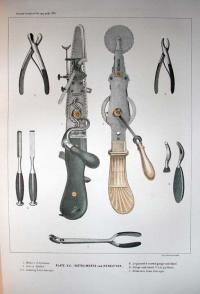
Color plate of surgical instruments from the MSHWR

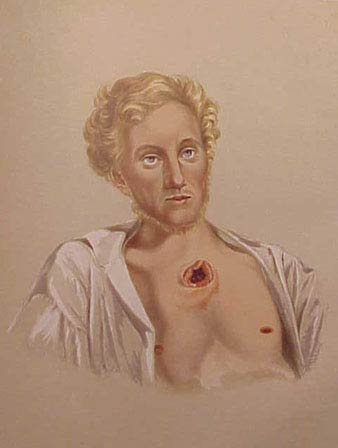
Color plate of a wound patient from the MSHWR

The Medical and Surgical History of the War of the Rebellion, 1861–65 (the MSHWR) was a United States Government Printing Office publication consisting of six volumes, issued between 1870 and 1888 and "prepared Under the Direction of Surgeon General United States Army, Joseph K. Barnes". The History was divided into three parts, each consisting of a medical history volume and a surgical history volume. The works detail tens of thousands of surgical cases and diseases occurring during the American Civil War (1861–1865).

== Contents ==
The MSHWR included numerous statistical summaries relating to diseases, wounds, and deaths in both the Union and Confederate armies, almost all of the material formed from the reports of U.S. Army medical directors, surgeons, doctors, and hospital staff. The accounts are a basic source for medical data on the War and also comprise an important source of information relating to individual soldiers. The names of the surgeons who submitted these case studies are almost always included, so the books can be helpful in tracking where an individual surgeon was at various times.

Hundreds of etchings, wood engravings, charts, and tables, as well as many photographs and color plates (lithographs, chromolithographs, albumen photographs, heliotypes, and woodburytypes) accompany the approximately 3,000 pages of densely printed text. (Almost every reproductive process available at the time can be found somewhere within the six volumes.)

== Editions and reprints ==
Publication of the MSHWR was preceded by publication of the Reports on the Extent and Nature of the Materials Available for the Preparation of a Medical and Surgical History of the Rebellion (Surgeon General's Office; War Department, J. B. Lippincott, 1865).

The MSHWR was reprinted (1990–1992) as The Medical and Surgical History of the Civil War (Broadfoot Publishing Company; editor, Dr. James I. ("Bud") Robertson, Jr., Alumni Professor of History, Virginia Polytechnic Institute and State University, Blacksburg, Virginia).

In addition to original printings and the reprinting, the MSHWR is also available on Compact Disc (CD) and on the internet/World Wide Web (see "External links").

== The volumes ==
- Part I, Volume I: Medical History (1870)

Prepared under the direction of Joseph K. Barnes, Surgeon General, United States Army, by J.J. Woodward, Assistant Surgeon United States Army. Consists of a series of statistical tables summarizing the monthly reports made to the Surgeon General regarding the Sickness of the Army, Deaths, and Discharges and is arranged into two groups: Part I refers to "Sickness and Mortality of White Troops" and Part II to "Colored Troops."

- Part I, Volume II: Surgical History (1870)

Prepared, under the direction of Joseph K. Barnes, Surgeon General United States Army, by George A. Otis, Assistant Surgeon, United States Army. Covers wounds and injuries of the head, face, neck, spine, and chest. Includes a chronological summary of engagements and battles.

- Part II, Volume I: Medical History (1879)

Prepared under the direction of Joseph K. Barnes, Surgeon General, United States Army, by Joseph Janvier Woodward, Surgeon, United States Army. Covers diarrhea and dysentery; Case studies and heliotype illustrations of diseases and sections of tissue, etc.

- Part II, Volume II: Surgical History (1876)

Prepared under the direction of Joseph K. Barnes, Surgeon General, United States Army by George A. Otis, Assistant Surgeon, United States Army. Covers injuries of the abdomen, pelvis, flesh wounds of the back, and wounds and injuries of the upper extremities.

- Part III, Volume I: Medical History (1888)

Prepared under the direction of Surgeon General John Moore, United States Army, by Charles Smart, Major and Surgeon, United States Army. Covers medical statistics; camp fevers [ typhus, etc.] and other miasmatic diseases; scurvy; diseases attributed to non-miasmatic exposure; and other diseases such as nostalgia, army itch, poisoning, alcoholism, and venereal diseases; Includes one small folding map.

- Part III, Volume II: Surgical History (1883)

Prepared under the direction of Joseph K. Barnes, Surgeon General United States Army by George A. Otis and D.L. Huntington. Covers "Wounds and Injuries of the Lower Extremities", "Miscellaneous Injuries", "Wounds and Complications", "Anesthetics", "The Medical Staff and Materia Chirurgica", and "Transportation of the Wounded".

== See also ==
- Army Medical Museum
- National Museum of Civil War Medicine
