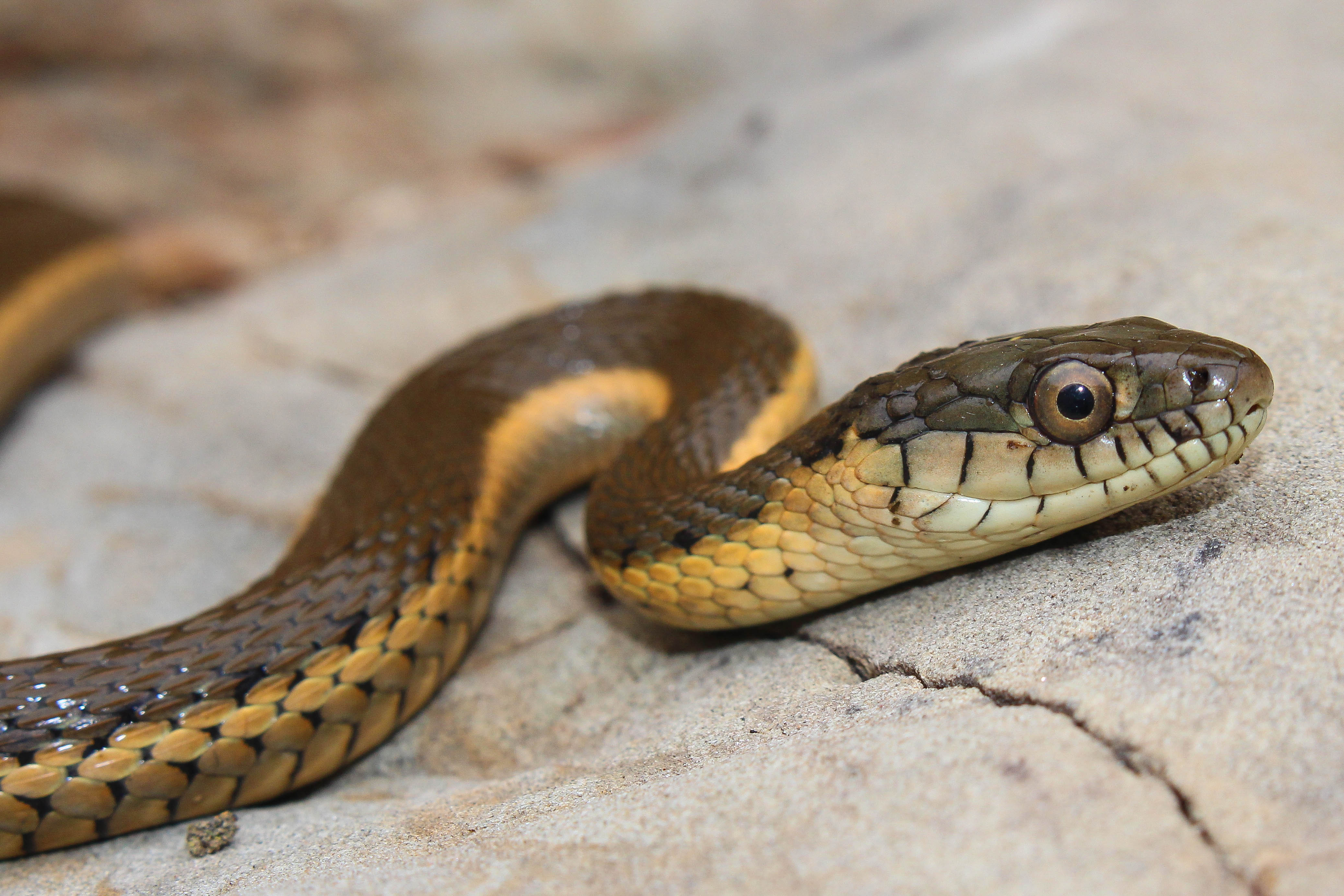

Conservation status
- Least Concern (IUCN 3.1)

Scientific classification
- Kingdom: Animalia
- Phylum: Chordata
- Class: Reptilia
- Order: Squamata
- Suborder: Serpentes
- Family: Colubridae
- Genus: Thamnophis
- Species: T. hammondii

Binomial name
- Thamnophis hammondii (Kennicott, 1860)

Synonyms
- Eutaenia hammondii Kennicott, 1860; Tropidonotus digueti Mocquard, 1899; Thamnophis hammondii — Stebbins, 1985

= Two-striped garter snake =

Species of snake

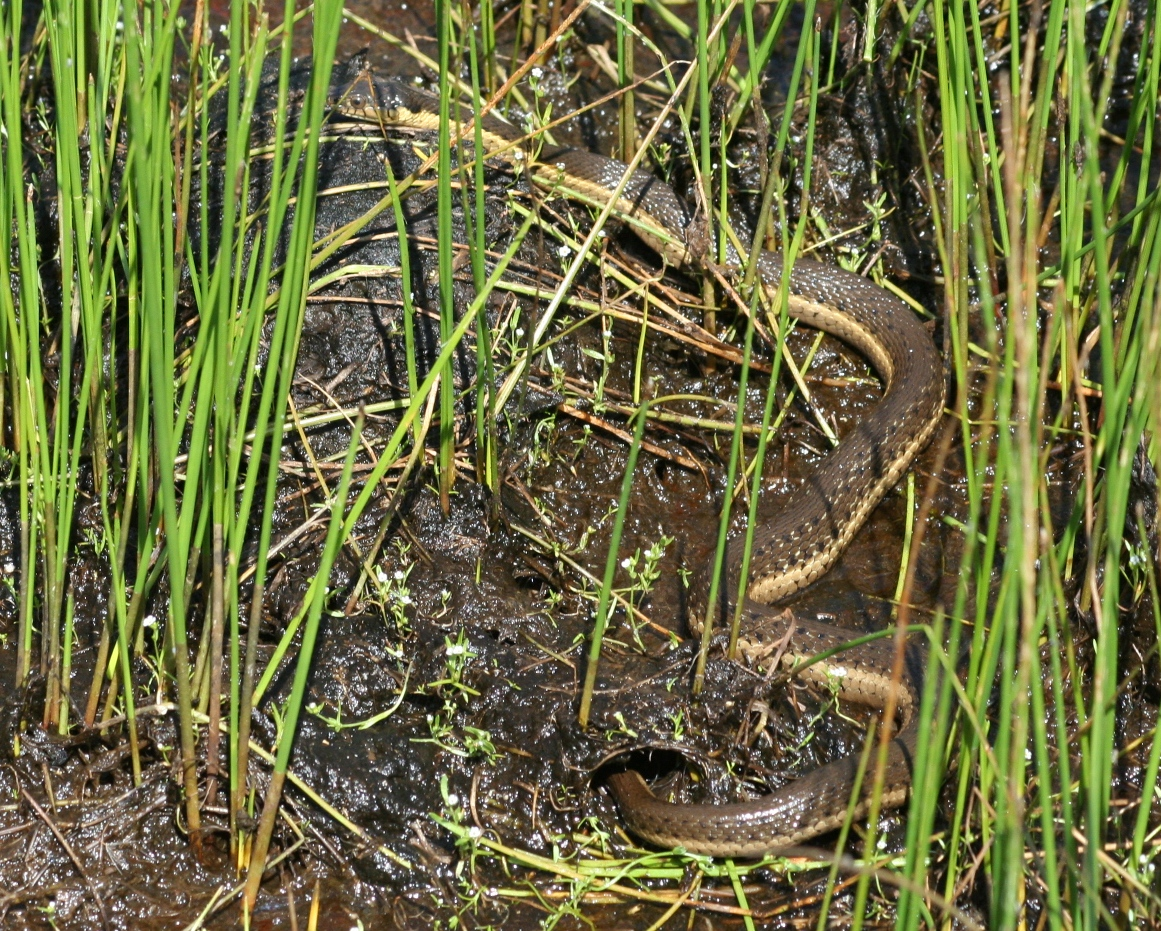
Two-striped garter snake in Riverside County, California

The two-striped garter snake (Thamnophis hammondii) is a species of aquatic snake in the subfamily Natricinae of the family Colubridae. The species is endemic to western North America.

== Taxonomy and etymology ==
The specific name hammondii is in honor of William A. Hammond, the U.S. Army surgeon who collected the first specimens.

== Description ==
T. hammondii is a medium-sized snake, 18–30 in (46–76 cm) in total length (including tail), with a head barely wider than the neck. Two common color variations occur in the wild, a striped variant and a checkered variant. The striped variant has a yellowish lateral stripe on each side, and a fairly uniform dorsal coloring. The checkered variant lacks the lateral stripes and has two rows of small dark spots on each side.

== Geographic range, habitat, and diet ==
The two-striped garter snake is found in western North America, ranging from central California to Baja California, Mexico. It is a highly aquatic species, and prefers habitat adjacent to permanent or semi-permanent bodies of water. This species feeds primarily on fishes and amphibians.

== Reproduction ==
T. hammondii is ovoviviparous.
