= Army Medical Museum =

Army Medical Museums:

- Army Medical Services Museum – United Kingdom
- National Museum of Health and Medicine – United States of America
- Russian Museum of Military Medicine
