= Krau =

Krau may refer to:

- Carolyn Krau (born 1943), British figure skater
- Krau Wildlife Reserve, Malaysia

== See also ==
- Crau
- Kraus
