= Joseph Janvier Woodward =

American physician and surgeon

Lieutenant Colonel Joseph Janvier Woodward (1833–1884), commonly known as J. J. Woodward, was an American surgeon.

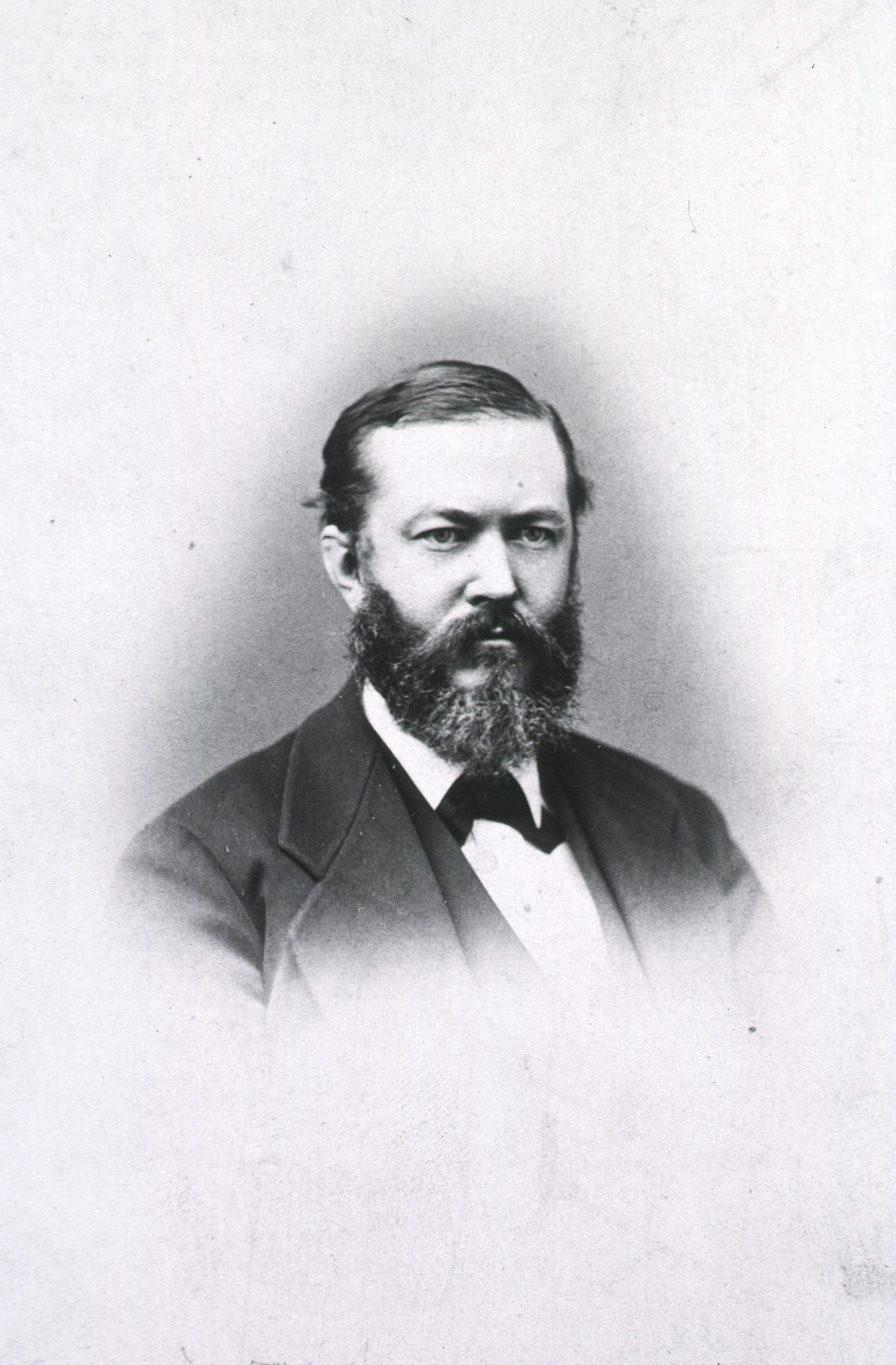
Portrait of Joseph Janvier Woodward

== Biography ==
Woodward served in the U.S. Civil War as Army Assistant Surgeon and produced several publications on war-related diseases. He was also a microscopist known worldwide and an instrumental pioneer in photo-microscopy.

A collection of his photo-micrographs are preserved at the Royal Microscopical Society in the UK. Woodward performed and wrote reports on the autopsies of both Abraham Lincoln and John Wilkes Booth. He also attended to president Garfield after he was shot. A collection of bulletins on Garfield's condition issued by the attending physicians is held at the National Library of Medicine in Bethesda, Maryland.

According to a website run by the National High Magnetic Field Laboratory: "Woodward was the first scientist to establish photomicrography as a tool for both scientific and medical investigations." According to an article in the Archives of Pathology and Laboratory Medicine: "In addition to collecting specimens for the museum's archive, he co-authored the definitive medical history of the Civil War in the 6-volume 1870 publication of the MSHWR.4 Woodward's technique using aniline dyes for staining thin sections of tissue, along with his pioneering work in photomicroscopy, helped prepare the groundwork for modern surgical pathology."

In 1881, Woodward served as president of the Philosophical Society of Washington. He was also a curator of certain sections of the Army Medical Museum.

== Personal life ==
Woodward's sister was the musician and writer, Aubertine Woodward Moore.

== See also ==
- Medical and Surgical History of the War of the Rebellion
