= List of New York State Historic Markers in Sullivan County, New York =

This is a complete list of New York State Historic Markers in Sullivan County, New York.

== Listings county-wide ==
| | Marker name | Image | Date designated | Location | City or Town | Marker text |
|---|---|---|---|---|---|---|
| 1 | Clark Tannery | | | On So. Side NYS 52 At Eastern End of Jeffersonville | Callicoon, New York | Contained 182, Square Vats Produced 600, 051 Lbs. Sole Leather In 1865. Ranked Second In Output In Sullivan County |
| 2 | Early Sawmill | | | On W. Side NYS 52 At Southern End of Youngsville | Callicoon, New York | Built 1834 By Sam M. Young Followed In Turn By Turning Mill, Apple Brandy Distillery And Milk Manufacturing Plant |
| 3 | First Clearing | | | On NYS 52 1 Mi. Youngsville | Callicoon, New York | In 1807 J.S. Jackson And C. Hurd Cleared Over 100 Acres For John De Witt At A Cost of 163 19S |
| 4 | George G. De Witt | | | On W. Side NYS 52 Between Jeffersonville & Youngsville | Callicoon, New York | Home of George G. De Witt Where First Town Meeting Was Held May 3, 1842 500 Feet West |
| 5 | Old Toll Road | | | On E. Side NYS 52 Midway Between Jeffersonville, & Youngsville | Callicoon, New York | Callicoon And Cochecton Turnpike 1852 Joined Erie At Cochecton With Tanneries At Pike Pond Jeffersonville, Youngsville |
| 6 | Old Turnpike | | | On NYS 52 About 1½ Mis. N.E. Jeffersonville | Callicoon, New York | Old Turnpike Jeffersonville To Monticello Toll Gate Two Miles East of This Point |
| 7 | Site of First House | | | In Center of Vlge. Youngsville In Front of John Pfieffle Residence | Callicoon, New York | Site of First House In Youngsville Built of Logs, 1834 By Sam M. Young, First Settler For Whom The Place Is Named |
| 8 | Sullivan Volkblatt | | | On No. Side Main St. Between Center St. & Delaware Av., Vlge. of Jeffersonv | Callicoon, New York | Local German Language Newspaper Published Here 1870German Language Predominated Here For Fifty Years |
| 9 | Tannery of Henry Inderlied | | | On So. Side NYS 52 Near Center of Youngsville | Callicoon, New York | Beef Hides Were Converted Into Sole Leather By Use of Local Hemlock Bard 1850 |
| 10 | Brant's Camp | | | On W. Side NYS 42 2Mis. So. Forestburg Corners | Forestburg, New York | Mohawk Chief With Plunder And Captives Taken In Raid On Minisink (Port Jervis) Camped Here Over Night July 20, 1779 |
| 11 | Indian Raid | | | On W. Side Co. Rd. 49 About 1 Mi. So. Oakland | Forestburg, New York | Two Children of John Brooks And Son-In-Law, Joseph Hubbard, Were Killed Here By Brant's Mohawks And Tories, 1778 |
| 12 | Sawmill | | | On No. Side Co. Rd. 49 Near W. End Bridge Over Minisink R. | Forestburg, New York | Built 1873 By Westfall & Cuddeback. Sawed Lumber To Rebuild Houses Burned By Brant In Minisink (Port Jervis) 1778-79 |
| 13 | Battle of Minisink | | | On NYS 97 About 1½ Mis. E. of Minisink Ford. | Highland, New York | Col. Joseph Brant Led 40 Mohawks And Tories Up This Ravine And Ambushed N.Y. And N.J. Militia Lying For Him On Hill To The West |
| 14 | Battle of Minisink | | | On NYS 97 At Minisink Ford. | Highland, New York | Entrance To Battlefield Where July 22, 1779, N.Y. And N.J. Militia Attacked Mohawk And Tory Raiders of Minisink (Port Jervis) |
| 15 | Battle of Minisink | | | On NYS 97 About 1 Mi. West of Entrance To Battlefield. | Highland, New York | One of The Deadliest In Frontier Warfare, Between Militia And Brant's Tories And Mohawks, On This Hill July 22, 1779 |
| 16 | Battle of Minisink | | | On NYS 97 About 1/2 Mile East of Entrance To Battlefield. | Highland, New York | On This Hill, July 22, 1779 N.Y. And N.J. Militia Were Decimated By Mohawk And Tory Raiders of Minisink, (Port Jervis) Under Brant |
| 17 | Brant's Camp | | | On NYS 97 At Barryville. | Highland, New York | The Mohawk Leader of Raid On Minisink (Port Jervis) Camped Here July 21, 1779. Pursuing Militia Camped 3 Miles Up This Same Brook |
| 18 | Brant's Crossing | | | On NYS 97 Near Entrance To Battlefield | Highland, New York | After Battle of Minisink Brants Raiders With Their Plunder Forded River Here To Camp At Mouth of The Lackawaxen Creek Opposite |
| 19 | Bridge | | | On NYS 97 At Minisink Ford | Highland, New York | Built By John A. Roebling, Builder of Brooklyn Bridge, To Support D. & H. Canal Aqueduct By Which Boats Crossed Delaware, 1848–98 |
| 20 | Early Settlers | | | On NYS 52 About 1 Mile East of White Sulphur Springs | Highland, New York | Joseph And Ebenezer Hill Came From Conn., 1807 Bought 5000 Acres In Hardenbergh Patent. Joseph Was Captain In War of 1812. |
| 21 | First House | | | On NYS 52, White Sulphur Springs | Highland, New York | In Robertsonville Now Called White Sulphur Springs 1812 |
| 22 | Robertsonville | | | On NYS 52 At White Sulphur Springs | Highland, New York | Jonathan Bradley Robertson Came Here From Bridgeport, Conn., 1807, When It Was A Forest Wilderness. He Served In War of 1812 |
| 23 | D. & H. Canal | | | On NYS 97 At Mouth of Mill Brook Near Pond Eddy | Lumberland, New York | D. & H. Canal Dry Dock And Basin 1828–1898 |
| 24 | Bloomingburgh | | | On NYS 17 At Bloomingburgh | Mamakating, New York | Named July 4, 1812, By James Newkirk. First Settler, Capt. John Newkirk, Prior To 1776. First School, 1784, Taught By Mr. Campbell. |
| 25 | Bloomingburgh | | | On NYS 17 At Bloomingburgh | Mamakating, New York | Site of First Newspaper, First Printing Office, First Circuit Court, And The First Academy In Sullivan County |
| 26 | Burlingham | | | On County Rd. At Burlingham | Mamakating, New York | Named In Honor of Walter Burling, Director of Ulster And Orange Branch Turnpike, Which Crossed Shawangunk Kill At Newkirk's Mills, 1808 |
| 27 | Early Academy | | | On NYS 17K At West End Old Bridge At Bloomingburgh | Mamakating, New York | Bloomingburgh Academy Built 1810, First Teacher Alpheus Dimmick, Principal Samuel Pitts, Union College. Had Many Famous Graduates |
| 28 | Fort Devens | | | On US 209 About 1½ Miles North of Wurtsboro | Mamakating, New York | 1757 - One of Chain of Forts Built Under Supervision of James Clinton, Later General Clinton, During French & Indian War |
| 29 | Michel Helm | | | On US 209 About 2 Miles North of Wurtsboro | Mamakating, New York | Killed And Scalped Here During French And Indian War, While On Way From Visiting His Daughter At Minisink, To His Home In Rochester |
| 30 | Roosa Fort | | | On Town Rd. at Roosa Gap | Mamakating, New York | Building Started Before Revolutionary War. Later Owned And Completed By Abraham Roosa Or Son Jacob Who Lived In Cabin On Hill |
| 31 | Westbrook Fort | | | On US 209 At Westbrookville | Mamakating, New York | And House Built About 1750-60 By Tjerck Van Keuren Westbrook. Village of Westbrookville Named In His Honor |
| 32 | Grahamsville | | | At Intersection NYS 42 & NYS 55 At Grahamsville | Neversink, New York | (Formerly - Chestnut Woods) Named For Lt. John Graham Killed Here With 17 Others Sept. 5 1778, By Indians Raiding The Rondout Valley |
| 33 | John Karst Preserve | | | On Town Rd. At De Bruce | Rockland, New York | Home of Famous Wood Engraver, Illustrator of Early American School Books; Mc Guffy's Readers. Born 1838-Died 1922 |
| 34 | John Karst Home | | | On Town Rd. About 3 Miles North of De Bruce | Rockland, New York | Collection of Early Crafts Brought Here 1907 By Master Wood Engraver. Meeting Place of "Down Renters" Or "The Sheepskin Indians", 1804 |
| 35 | Camp Holley | | | On NYS 42 Near Kiamesha | Thompson, New York | Encampment Ground of 143Rd Regiment, New York Volunteer Infantry Aug. 14 - Oct. 10, 1862 |
| 36 | First House | | | On NYS 17 At Monticello | Thompson, New York | In Monticello Built By John P. Jones Founder of Village December 1804 |
| 37 | Methodist Church | | | On NYS 17 At Monticello | Thompson, New York | Monticello, New York Organized In Districts, 1804; Present Church Built 1844 |
| 38 | Presbyterian Church | | | On NYS 17 At Monticello | Thompson, New York | First Church In Monticello Established 1810 Lot Gift of Jones Brothers |
| 39 | Town of Thompson | | | At Bridge Near Old Mill, Thompsonville | Thompson, New York | Named For William A Thompson First Judge of Sullivan County Appointed 1803 |
| 40 | New York State | | | On NYS 52, Del. R. Bridge. Narrowsburg | Tusten, New York | Explored By Dutch, 1609 Settled By Dutch, 1624; Under English Rule After 1664. Named For Duke of York, Later King James II |
| 41 | Tusten | | | On NYS 97 Near Old Tusten Church Tusten | Tusten, New York | Named For Lt. Col. Benjamin Tusten of Goshen Militia Surgeon Who Gave His Life To Attend The Wounded At The Battle of Minisink |

== See also ==
- List of New York State Historic Markers
- National Register of Historic Places listings in New York
- List of National Historic Landmarks in New York
