= Central New York Railroad =

Railway line in the United States

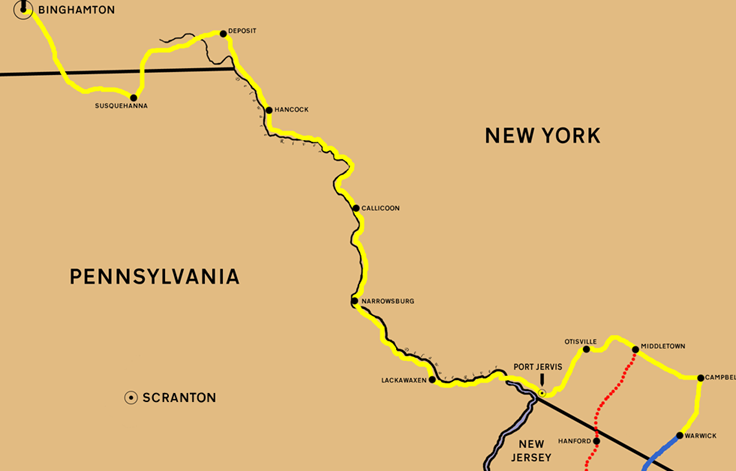
- CNYK (Binghamton to Port Jervis) and adjoining portions of the Southern Tier Line

Overview
- Headquarters: Cooperstown, New York, U.S.
- Reporting mark: CNYK
- Locale: West Branch Delaware River
- Dates of operation: 1972–1988; 2004–Present

Technical
- Track gauge: 4 ft 8 1/2 in (1,435 mm) standard gauge
- Length: 123.1 miles (198.1 km)

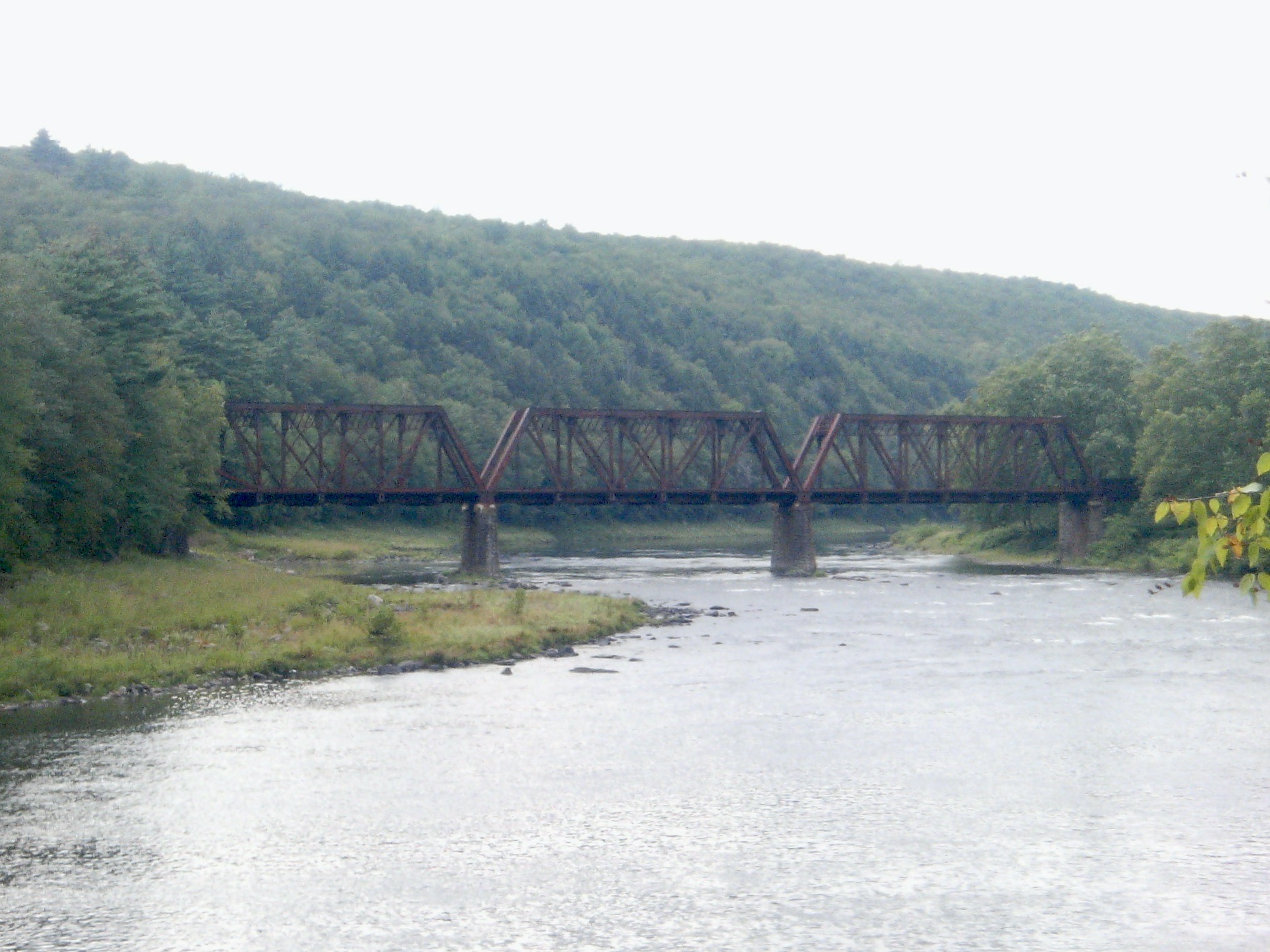
Bridge over the Delaware River at Tusten NY / Lackawaxen PA, CNYK territory on the Southern Tier Line

The Central New York Railroad (reporting mark CNYK) refers to two separate uses of the same railroad name and charter by the Delaware Otsego Corporation.

Delaware Otsego used the Central New York Railroad charter and name first for a shortline railroad near Utica from 1973 to 1988. The second use of the charter was a paper railroad which operates over the Southern Tier line to join the Northern and Southern divisions of the New York, Susquehanna and Western Railway (NYS&W), beginning in 2005

The current Central New York Railroad operates local freight service using NYS&W equipment in New York and Pennsylvania along Southern Tier Line trackage. The line originated as part of the Erie Railroad before becoming part of Erie Lackawanna, Conrail, and finally Norfolk Southern.

The line runs along the Upper Delaware River valley between Port Jervis and Binghamton. From Port Jervis, the line reaches Sparrow Bush before crossing a bridge over the Delaware into Millrift, Pennsylvania. There the line follows the contour of the valley north to reach Pond Eddy, Shohola, Lackawaxen, and Masthope before crossing back into New York State at Tusten. From there the line stays in New York through the towns of Narrowsburg, Cochecton, Callicoon, Hankins, and Hancock, north to Deposit. There the railroad heads in a southwestern direction to reach its high point at Gulf Summit before crossing back into Pennsylvania, reaching the Susquehanna River near Lanesboro, where it passes over the Starrucca Viaduct. The line then runs west to Great Bend before curving north to cross back into New York and then to Binghamton.

== History ==
The original Central New York Railroad was a 21.7-mile (34.9 km) branch line between Richfield Junction near Cassville and Richfield Springs, New York, first opened in November 1872 as part of the Utica, Chenango and Susquehanna Valley Railway. The railway was later absorbed into the Delaware, Lackawanna and Western Railroad (DL&W), which in turn merged into the Erie Lackawanna Railway (EL). By the early 1970s, the Richfield Springs branch was deemed unprofitable by the EL, and they opted to abandon it.

Walter Rich, the owner of the Delaware Otsego Corporation (DO), believed the branch could be reorganized as a profitable freight operation, and he was interested in expanding his company's short line assets. In 1972, DO purchased the Richfield Springs branch from the EL, and the new Central New York Railroad commenced operations on December 12. The CNYK initially turned profits for DO, since they served a number of freight customers who still relied on rail services, such as Agway's propane distribution firm.

In 1982, DO purchased two former EL routes out of Binghamton, New York, from Conrail, one of which provided the CNYK's connection to the National rail network. The CNYK and the two routes quickly became labeled as the Northern Division of the New York, Susquehanna and Western Railway (NYS&W), another DO subsidiary. Throughout the 1980s, the CNYK's freight profits gradually declined, and in 1987, the eastern end of the line was shut down. In early 1988, the CNYK suspended the rest of their operations, and they were authorized to abandon their line in August 1995. While the CNYK became inactive from 1988 to 2004, the CNYK charter was still intact.

On January 1, 2005, DO reactivated the CNYK as a paper corporation, when they leased the Binghamton-Port Jervis section of the Southern Tier Line from the Norfolk Southern Railway (NS). NS retained overhead trackage rights to operate through freight traffic. All trains the CNYK operates are powered by locomotives owned by the NYS&W, which interchanges with Norfolk Southern at Binghamton and Warwick.

== Bibliography ==
- Hartley, Scott (January 1988). "Regionals In Review - The Delaware Otsego Story". Trains. Vol. 48, no. 3. Kalmbach Publishing. pp. 30–37.
