= Tusten =

Tusten may be

- Benjamin Tusten, a military leader killed at the Battle of Minisink.
- Tusten, New York, a town named after Benjamin Tusten.
