= Pond Eddy Bridge =

Petit truss bridge in Pond Eddy, US

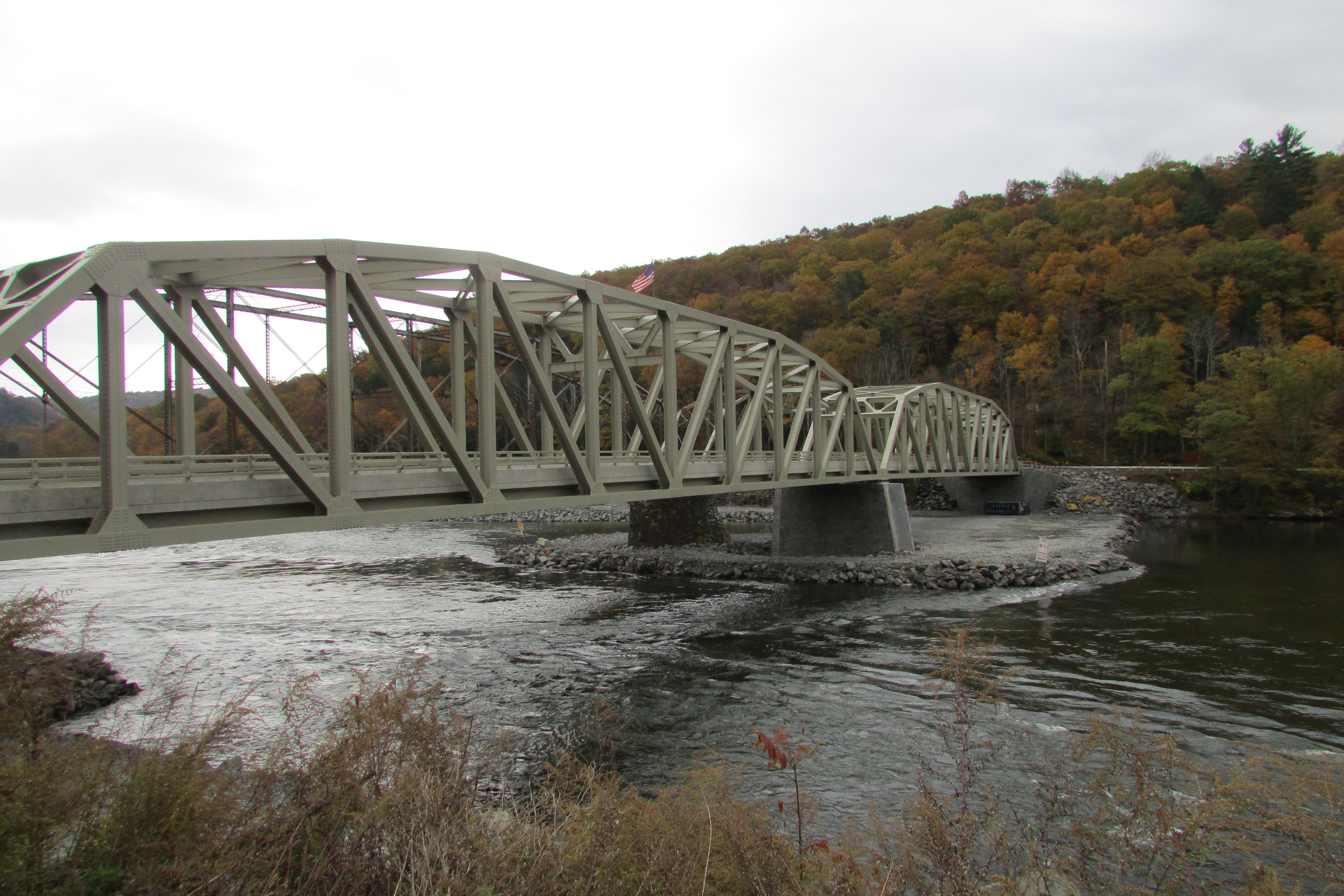
- Coordinates: 41°26′21″N 74°49′11″W
- Carries: State Route 1011 (Pennsylvania); CR 41 (New York)
- Crosses: Delaware River
- Locale: Pond Eddy, NY-PA
- Owner: New York–Pennsylvania Joint Interstate Bridge Commission
- Maintained by: New York–Pennsylvania Joint Interstate Bridge Commission

Characteristics
- Design: Double Parker Truss
- Material: Steel, concrete
- No. of spans: 2

History
- Designer: PennDOT
- Constructed by: PennDOT
- Opened: 2018

Location
- Interactive map of Pond Eddy Bridge

The Pond Eddy Bridge is a truss bridge spanning the Delaware River between the hamlet of Pond Eddy in Lumberland, New York and the settlement informally called Pond Eddy in Shohola Township, Pennsylvania; it is the Pennsylvania community's only road connection. It is accessible from NY 97 in Lumberland on the New York side and two dead-end local roads, Flagstone Road (State Route 1011) and Rosa Road on the Pennsylvania side. The current bridge was built in 2018, replacing one from 1903.

== History ==
=== The 1870 suspension bridge ===
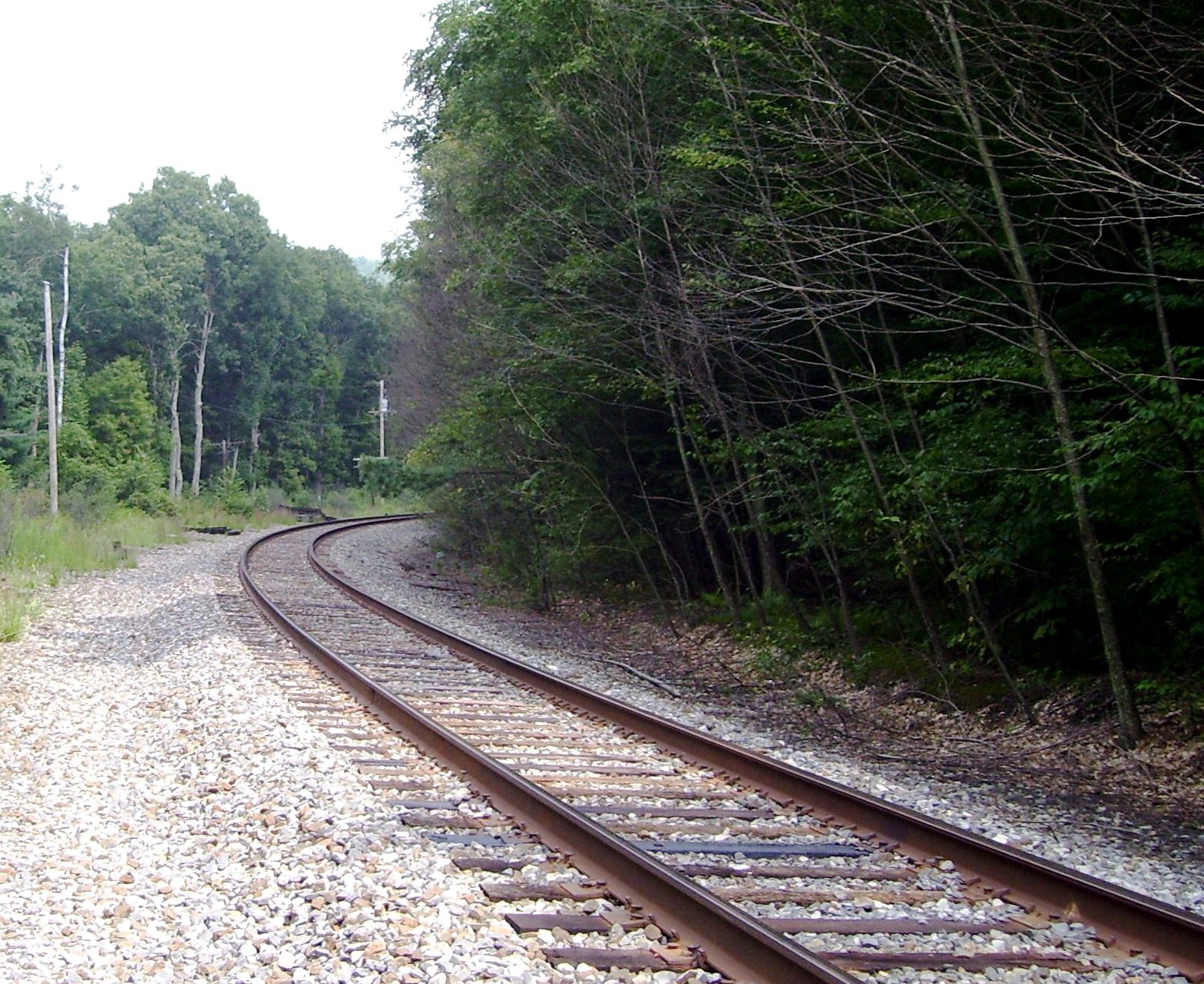
Erie Railroad tracks, now part of the Norfolk Southern system, run along the ridge on the Pennsylvania side of the bridge, paralleling the river and the local road below it.

Settlement around Pond Eddy was triggered by the Delaware and Hudson Canal, which was constructed in the 1820s. The Erie Railroad, on the Pennsylvania side, also contributed to the community's growth. After Pond Eddy continued to grow in both states, local officials decided a bridge should be erected to connect the two communities. The new bridge would make it easier to ship bluestone, slate, and lumber via the railroad. In 1870 a new bridge was funded with taxpayer money, and the Town of Lumberland helped build the new Pond Eddy Bridge. The new bridge was a wire-rope suspension bridge, similar to those used by John Augustus Roebling. James D. Decker, then the Sullivan County sheriff and former Lumberland town supervisor was hired to supervise the construction of the bridge. He lived so close to the bridge site that it was soon nicknamed "Decker's Bridge". When finished, the new bridge was 521 feet (159 m) long and 12 feet (3.7 m) wide, enough to hold the anticipated traffic. It stood 31 feet (9.4 m) above the water, higher than most bridges on the Delaware.

Historians believe that from the beginning of the bridge's life, it was toll-free for Lumberland residents. Eventually the town leased the bridge out to private individuals, who collected tolls indiscriminately. During times when bridge could not be leased, the town retained control. The tollhouse was later removed and sold. It is now a home. Originally, the settlement of Pond Eddy on the Pennsylvania side was named Flagstone, but changed to its current name upon construction. Both Pond Eddys expanded rapidly. A new railroad station was created in Pond Eddy on the Pennsylvania side. The riverfront location on the New York side had two stores, a Methodist church, a telegraph office, eighteen homes, and a new hotel with a restaurant. The hotel had new owners around the time of the bridge and eventually became a large stop for travelers. The Pond Eddy Bridge served the town of Lumberland well in the late 19th century, but the area's prosperity did not last. The canal went out of business in 1898, after years of competition from railroads. The Erie station on the Pennsylvania had no roads to go anywhere, and the community began to decline. Decker died at 77 years old in 1900, having lived long enough to experience the rise and fall of Pond Eddy.

=== The 1903 petit truss bridge ===
1903 Pond Eddy Bridge
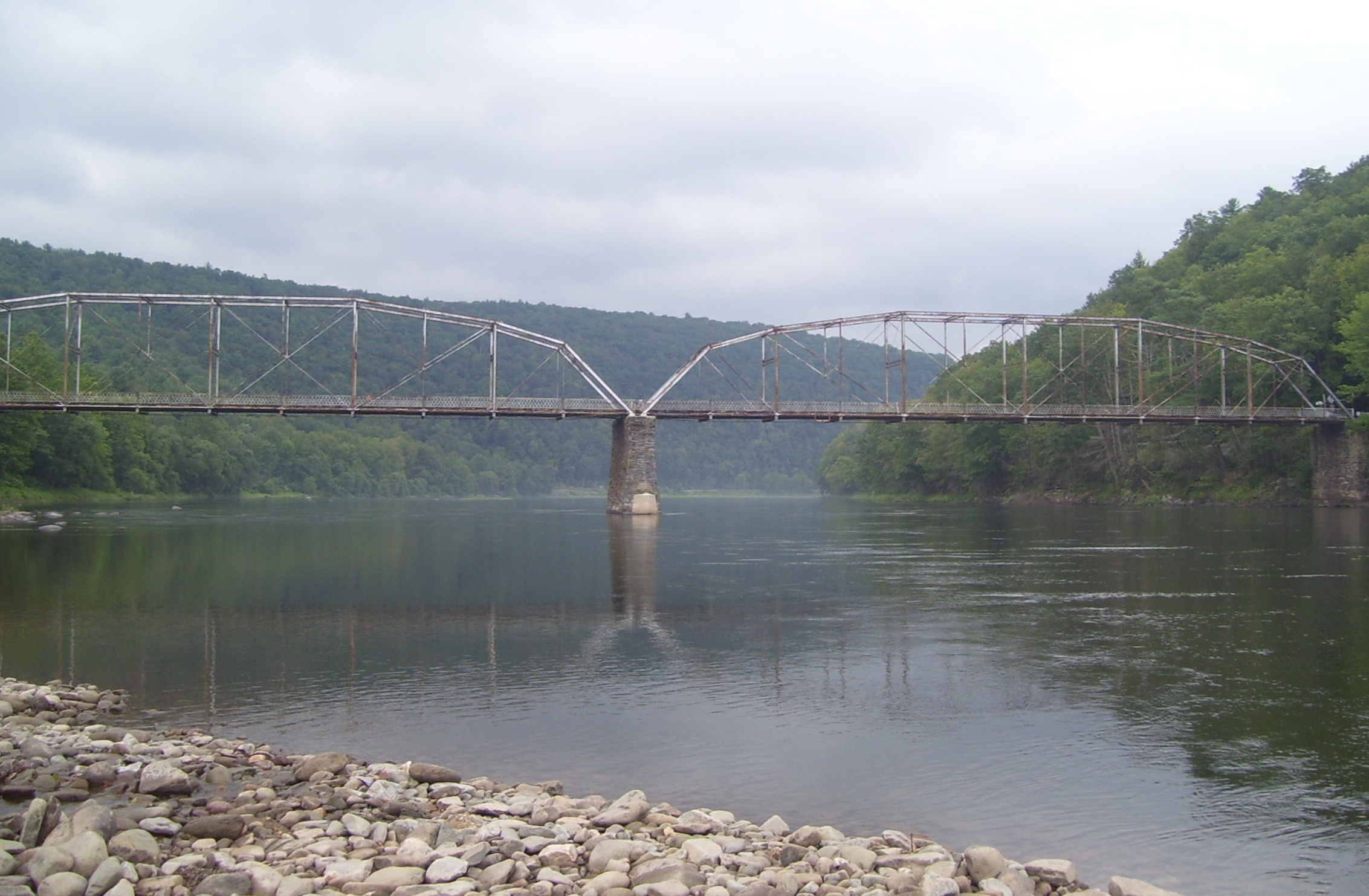
- The 1903 bridge from river level
- Coordinates: 41°26′21″N 74°49′11″W
- Carries: State Route 1011 (Pennsylvania); CR 41 (New York)
- Crosses: Delaware River
- Locale: Pond Eddy, NY-PA
- Owner: New York–Pennsylvania Joint Interstate Bridge Commission
- Maintained by: New York–Pennsylvania Joint Interstate Bridge Commission
- Heritage status: NRHP #88002170
- ID number: 000000000029949

Characteristics
- Design: Petit truss
- Material: Steel, wood
- Total length: 521 feet (159 m)
- Width: 12 feet (3.7 m)
- No. of spans: 2
- Load limit: 4 tons
- Clearance above: 13.5 feet (4.1 m)
- Clearance below: 31 feet (9.4 m)

History
- Designer: Oswego Bridge Company
- Constructed by: Oswego Bridge Company
- Opened: 1903

Statistics
- Daily traffic: 29

Location
- Interactive map of 1903 Pond Eddy Bridge

In 1903, the "floods of the century" struck the Delaware River Valley. Two storms of massive strength, including one from the Great Lakes converged in New Jersey, Pennsylvania, and New York on October 9, causing massive flooding. The Riverside Hotel received little damage, but homes and businesses were damaged heavily as well as the railroad. The 1870 bridge was destroyed in the storm. Lumberland hired the Oswego Bridge Company to build a replacement for $28,900 ($1,036,000 in contemporary dollars). The company built the current two-span, one-lane steel structure.

The lumber industries and stone mines on both sides of the river were eventually exhausted and closed. Tourists coming up the river from Port Jervis became the mainstay of the local economy. During the next two decades, seasonal homes and hotels were built in Pond Eddy.

During the 1920s, the Joint Bridge Commission in Pennsylvania and New York started buying up the tolled bridges along the Delaware. The town of Lumberland offered the Pond Eddy bridge to the Commission, but was refused. The bridge, according to the Commission, was already toll-free and adequately maintained. However, the town was eager to get rid of the responsibility to maintain the two-decade old structure, and continued to try. Finally in 1926, the Lumberland town supervisor, a friend of Pennsylvania Governor Gifford Pinchot, offered the commission the bridge for $1; around the same time, the commission paid $55,000 ($1,000,000 in 2025 dollars) for the Narrowsburg–Darbytown Bridge. The Joint Commission became the owner of both bridges. Since then the bridge's history has been virtually uneventful, surviving the flooding during the remains of Hurricane Diane in 1955 with little damage.

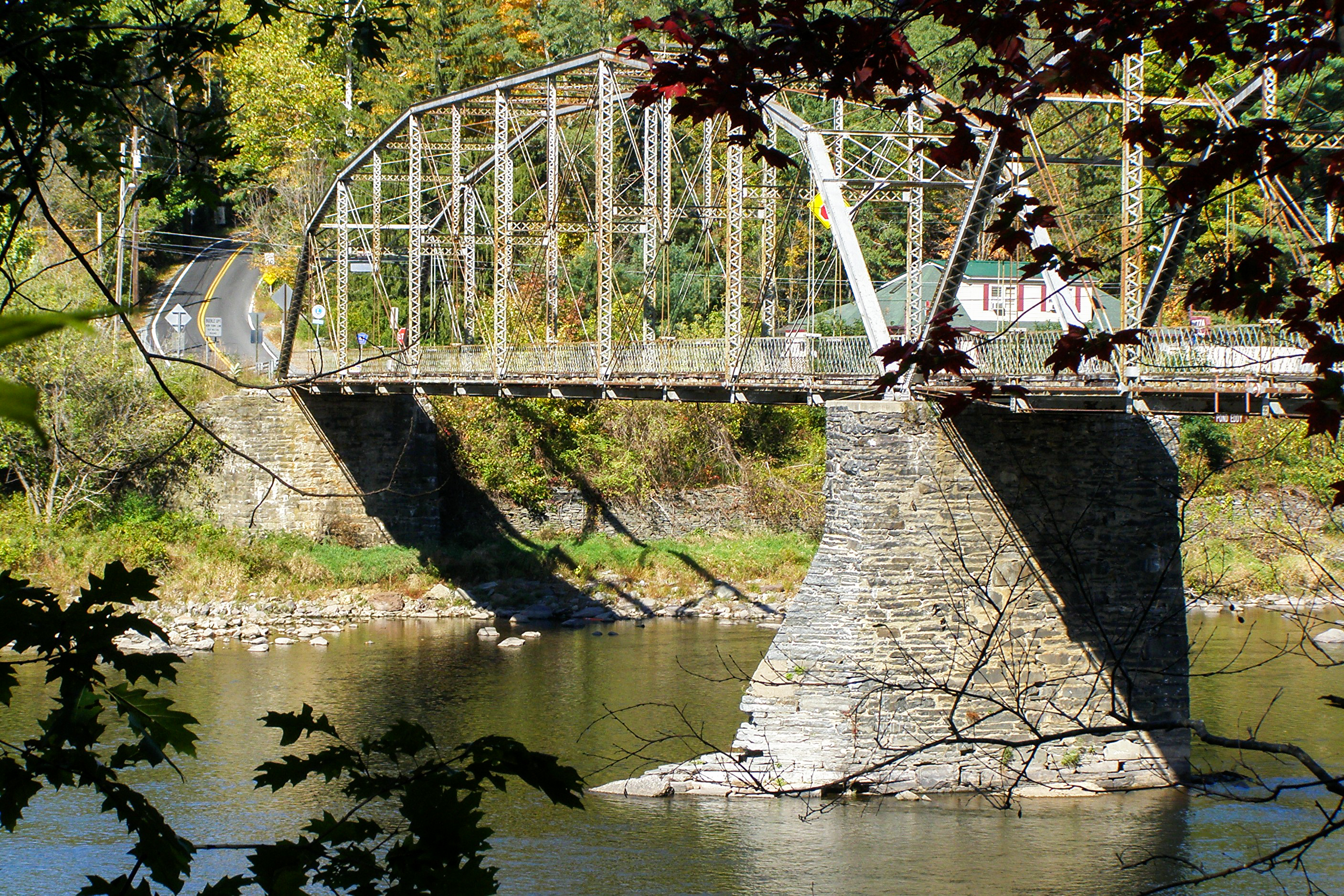
The 1903 bridge from the Pennsylvania side of the river, looking at New York

The bridge remained intact for many years and, in 1963, it was rededicated as the All Veterans Memorial Bridge by two local veterans groups. In 1998, it was nominated for the U.S. National Register of Historic Places for its engineering significance; it is also listed in the New York State Register of Historic Places.

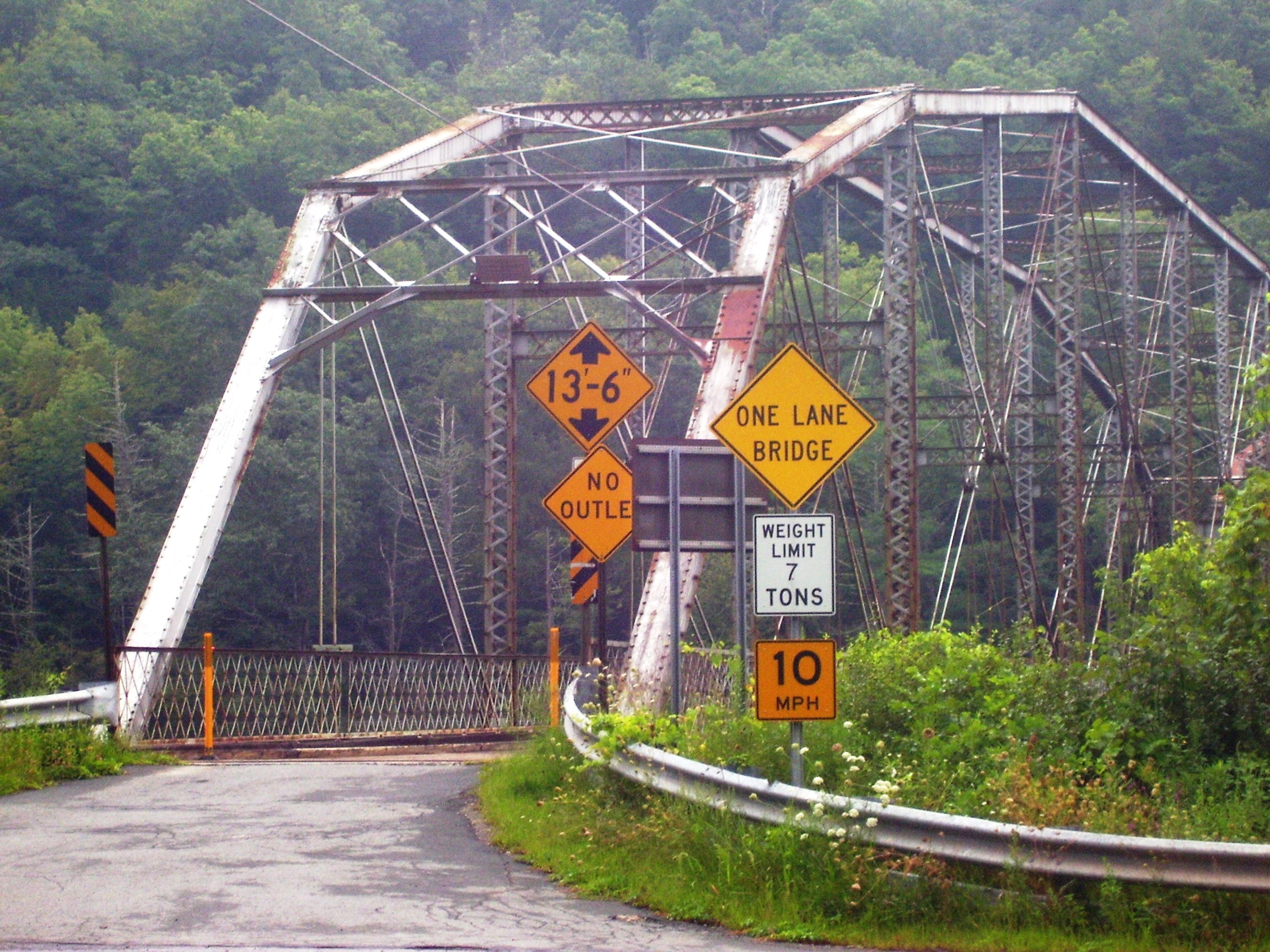
The approach to the old bridge from the south on Route 97 showing its 7-ton weight limit at the time

Over the years, the bridge's condition deteriorated, weakening its retaining strength. The National Bridge Inventory Survey categorized its condition as "Structurally Deficient" and "Basically intolerable requiring high priority of replacement". In 2005, the town of Narrowsburg passed a resolution calling on the Pennsylvania Department of Transportation (PennDOT) to replace the bridge. There was also a local movement to save the bridge. The bluestone quarries are no longer active, but the bridge still serves as the only access to 26 homes on the Pennsylvania side and the only access those residents have to emergency services. Because of the state of the bridge, planning for its replacement began in 1999. An accident involving a dump truck in 2015 accelerated the replacement of the bridge, which was completed in November 2018.

=== The 2018 truss bridge ===
In 2005, the community of Narrowsburg, New York, several miles upstream, requested that Pennsylvania Department of Transportation replace the 102-year-old structure. It had already had its weight limits reduced. The same year, an engineering firm in Millburn, New Jersey reported replacing the bridge would cost about $6.16 million, while keeping it would cost even more and raise its life expectancy by no more than 15 years. The Upper Delaware Council said that the 8 ton (7.2 tonne) limit on the bridge was inadequate for service trucks and emergency vehicles. The Shohola Township supervisors support maintaining the existing bridge, but the Lumberland Town Board was not convinced that it would be sufficient.

More proposals were made in 2007. Replacing the bridge would cost $7–8 million and take two years to complete. Rehabilitation would require bringing the bridge up to code so it could carry loads of up to 40 tons (36 tonnes). A preservation group formed to oppose a replacement. Its founder compared the bridge to the Dingmans Ferry Bridge on the Pennsylvania–New Jersey border, which carries similar traffic loads. One possibility is to replace the bridge, and move the antique structure elsewhere in Sullivan County, since it is a popular tourist attraction. In June 2008, a compromise was made defining the possibility of a $12 million bridge to replace the 104-year-old deteriorating structure. PennDOT suggested that they will let anyone preserve the bridge by taking it somewhere else. However, there was no response, and plans for the new bridge were initially scheduled to begin by 2010.

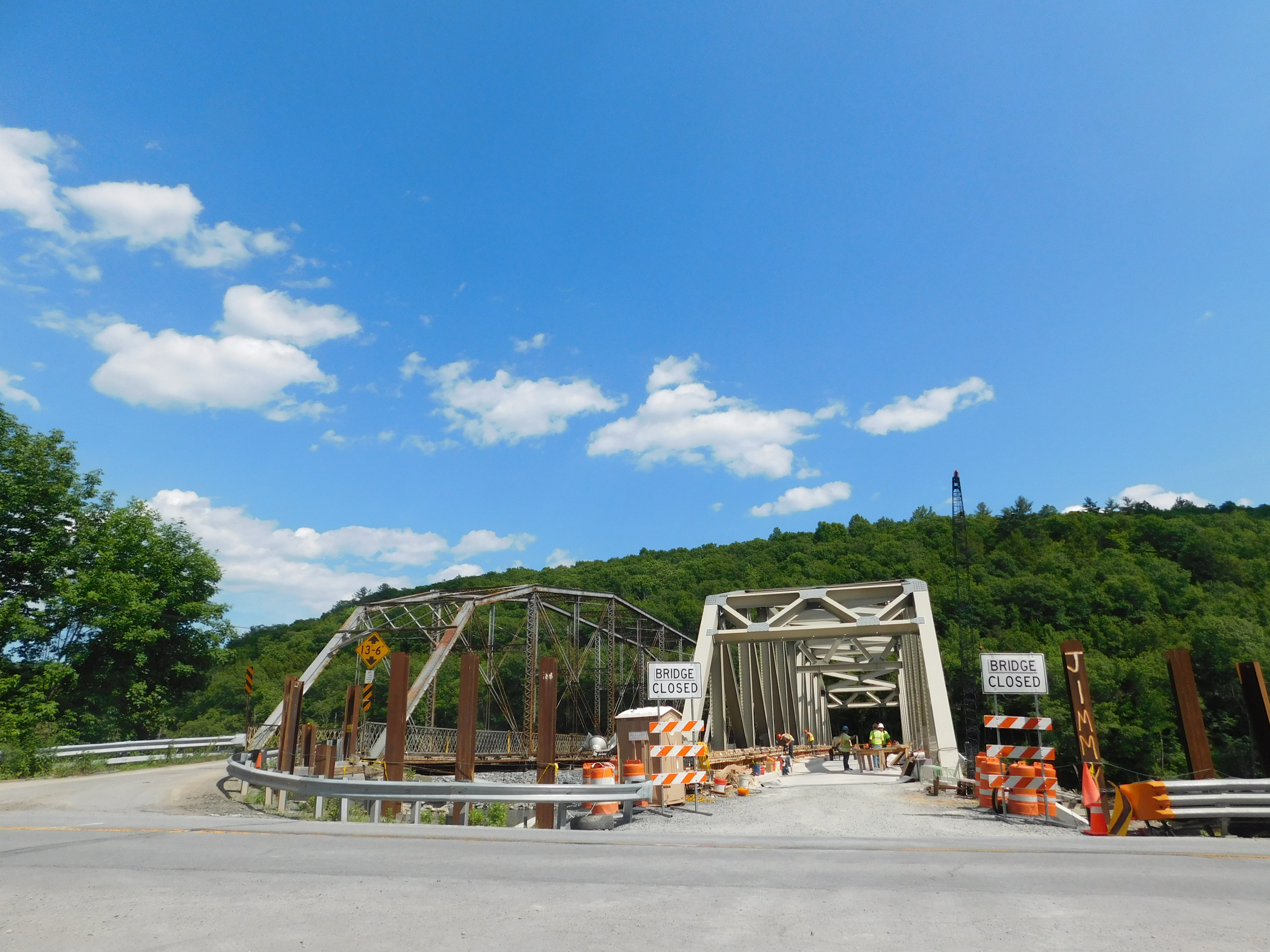
Construction of the new Pond Eddy Bridge in June 2018 with the old structure behind it

PennDOT began the Route 1011-Pond Eddy Bridge Replacement Project. Route 1011 is the internal designation for Flagstone Road, one of the two side roads in Pennsylvania along with the bridge. The state at that juncture proposed a four-span bridge with three connecting bridge piers, with four side options: replacing the bridge upstream, buying out the 26 residences on the Pennsylvania side, rehabilitating the structure to handle weights of 16-18 tons or maintain the bridge in its then current form. Depending on which project was chosen, the then estimated start would was to be in 2013, when the structure reached its 110th year in use. The entire project was estimated to be constructed ar a cost $8.5–11 million. Opponents of demolishing the bridge hoped that they could find a place to move the bridge, which would have cost $500,000, and have the new owners maintain it.

On December 17, 2010, PennDOT's District 4 downposted the bridge's weight limit to four tons due to deterioration on the bridge. PennDOT also fronted $350,000–$500,000 to replace 70 planks on the bridge, which restored the weight back to seven tons. Signage was adjusted for the demotion by both PennDOT and Sullivan County. Replacement began on April 18, 2011 of 64 stringer beams and on May 25, the project was completed, less than a month ahead of schedule. The seven-ton weight limit was also restored as a result of the completed construction. The cost of the project totaled out to $493,000 (2011 USD).

Officials from the state of New York stopped the replacement project in 2012 due to concerns of the local preservationist group, Save the Pond Eddy Bridge, which complained that the $12 million (2012 USD) project would only serve twelve families in Shohola Township and was a waste of taxpayer funding. The new bridge, which would have a weight limit of 40 tons and 32 feet (9.8 m) wide, caused New York State Department of Transportation to work with PennDOT to redesign the bridge. In May 2013, a deal was reached between all agencies, developing a new bridge that would be 22 feet (6.7 m) wide, with a single lane and sidewalk. The new bridge also got approval from the Federal Highway Administration despite the critics who thought it would be cheaper to build a road in Shohola Township side, which would be about 3.5 miles (5.6 km) of new road. The new bridge would look similar to the original structure and would cost about $9 million (2013 USD) to construct. The 15-month project however required the Delaware River its waters below the site rerouted for the construction.

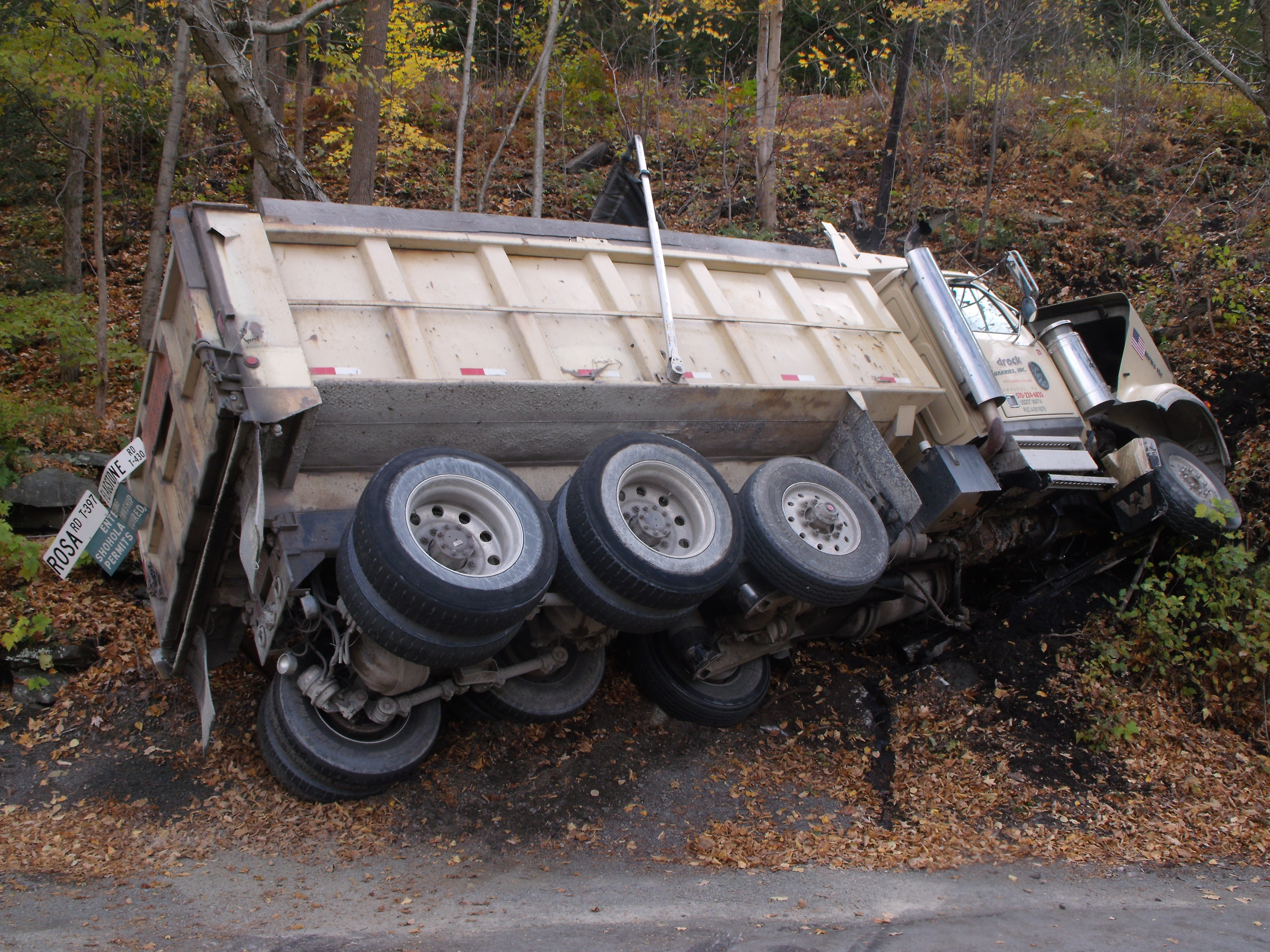
An over-weight dump truck crossed the Pond Eddy Bridge before crashing into the cliff on the Pennsylvania side, causing such damage as to accelerate the plans to replace the bridge.

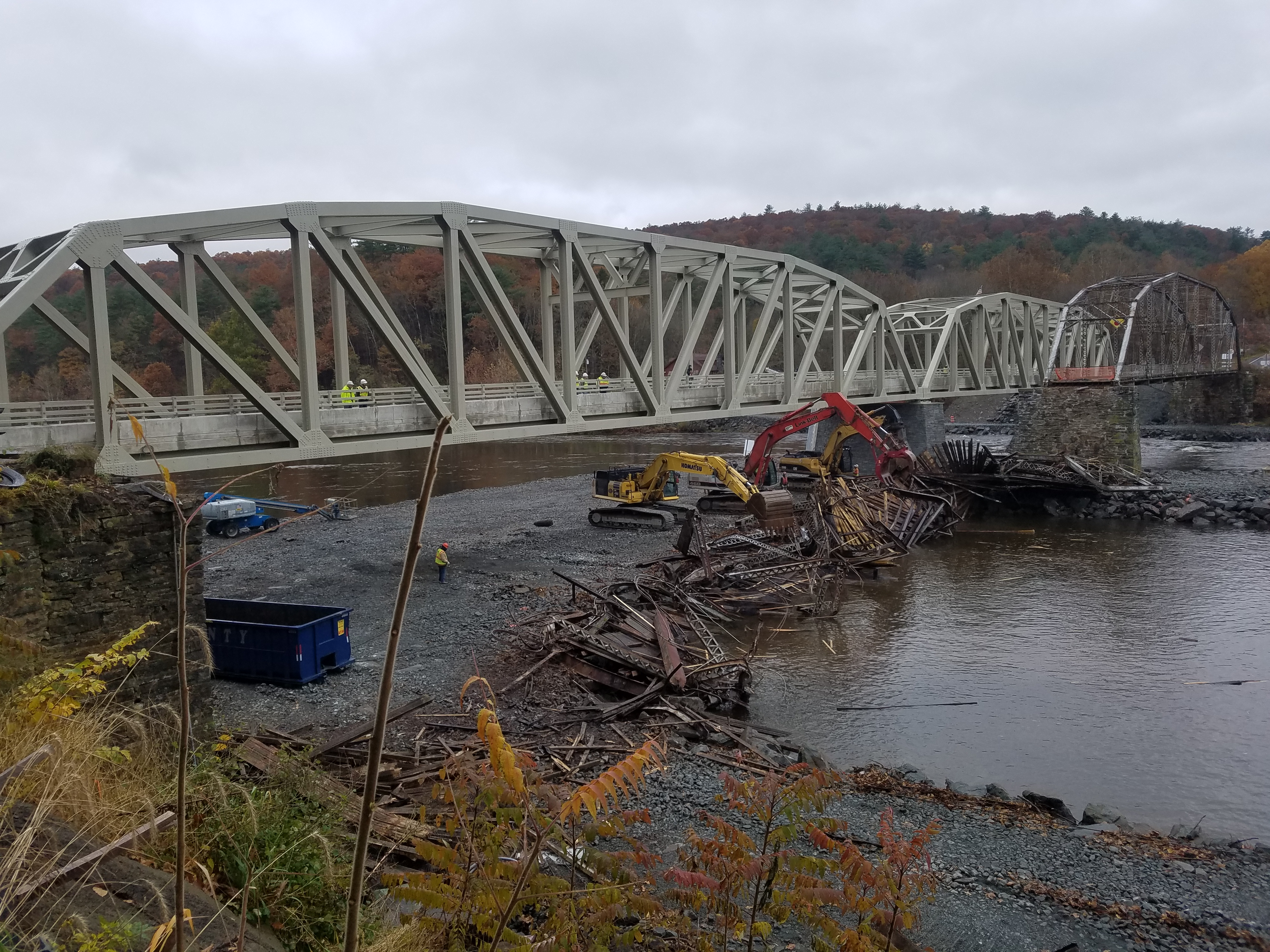
Demolition of the old bridge.

On July 14, 2014, PennDOT announced that they were opening bids on selling the Pond Eddy Bridge for people who wish to reassemble to use it as a bridge within the next ten years. The agency also sent out invitations for all municipalities in Lackawanna, Luzerne, Pike, Susquehanna, Wayne, and Wyoming counties.

In October 2015, a dump truck carrying stone dust lost its brakes coming down the hill directly in front of the bridge; it crossed the bridge and crashed. The stress of the accident accelerated the replacement of the bridge. The replacement bridge was built about 50 feet (15 m) upstream from the original, and although modernized with more robust framing, retained the characteristic trusses. Demolition of the old bridge entered the final phase on November 6, 2018. The project was completed in November 2018.

== See also ==
- List of bridges on the National Register of Historic Places in New York
- List of crossings of the Delaware River
- New York–Pennsylvania Joint Interstate Bridge Commission
- National Register of Historic Places listings in Pike County, Pennsylvania
- National Register of Historic Places listings in Sullivan County, New York
