= Lake DeVenoge =

Coordinates: 41°31′17″N 74°50′23″W

Lake DeVenoge is a private community located in the town of Highland in Sullivan County, New York, United States. It is known primarily for the lake itself and a formerly operating 9-hole golf course. It was developed in the early 1930s as a vacation community. Previously the area was owned by the DeVenoge family, originally of Switzerland, with the intention of expanding wine production from France to the United States.

The lake itself is unique because gasoline powered motors are prohibited, unlike many of the surrounding lakes such as Highland Lake and Mohican Lake. Fed entirely by underground springs, the 71 acres (29 ha) lake is 60 to 80 feet (18 to 24 m) deep at the center and typically runs 5 to 10 degrees cooler than surrounding lakes. As a result, the lake supports healthy populations of largemouth bass and rainbow trout.
