= Ten Mile River Baptist Church =

Historic church in New York, United States

- U.S. National Register of Historic Places
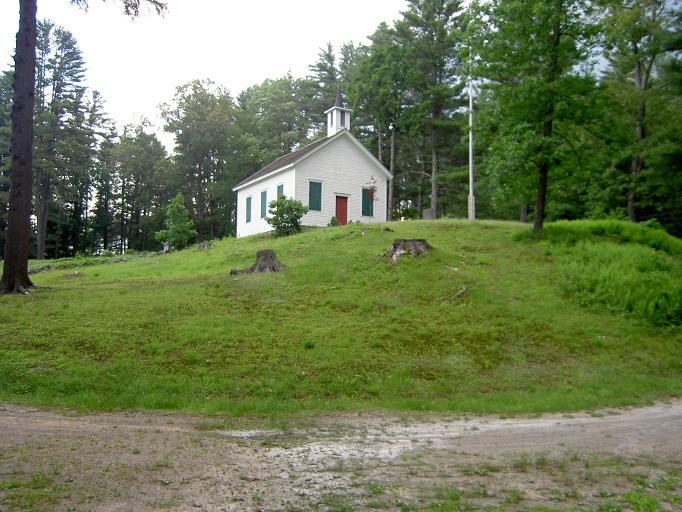

- Location within New York Location within the United States
- Location: NY 97, jct. with Cochecton Trnpk., Tusten, New York
- Coordinates: 41°33′36″N 75°1′0″W
- Area: 6 acres (2.4 ha)
- Built: 1856
- Architectural style: Greek Revival
- MPS: Upper Delaware Valley, New York and Pennsylvania, MPS
- NRHP reference No.: 97000422
- Added to NRHP: May 9, 1997

Ten Mile River Baptist Church, also known as Tusten Baptist Church, is a historic Baptist church on NY 97, at the junction with Cochecton Turnpike in Tusten, Sullivan County, New York. It was built in 1856 and is a small frame meeting house with modest Greek Revival style detailing. It features a small, reconstructed, bell tower and spire. The church cemetery includes the gravesite of Gustavus A. Neumann, founding editor of the New Yorker Staats-Zeitung.

It was added to the National Register of Historic Places in 1997.
