= Fort Decker =

- U.S. National Register of Historic Places
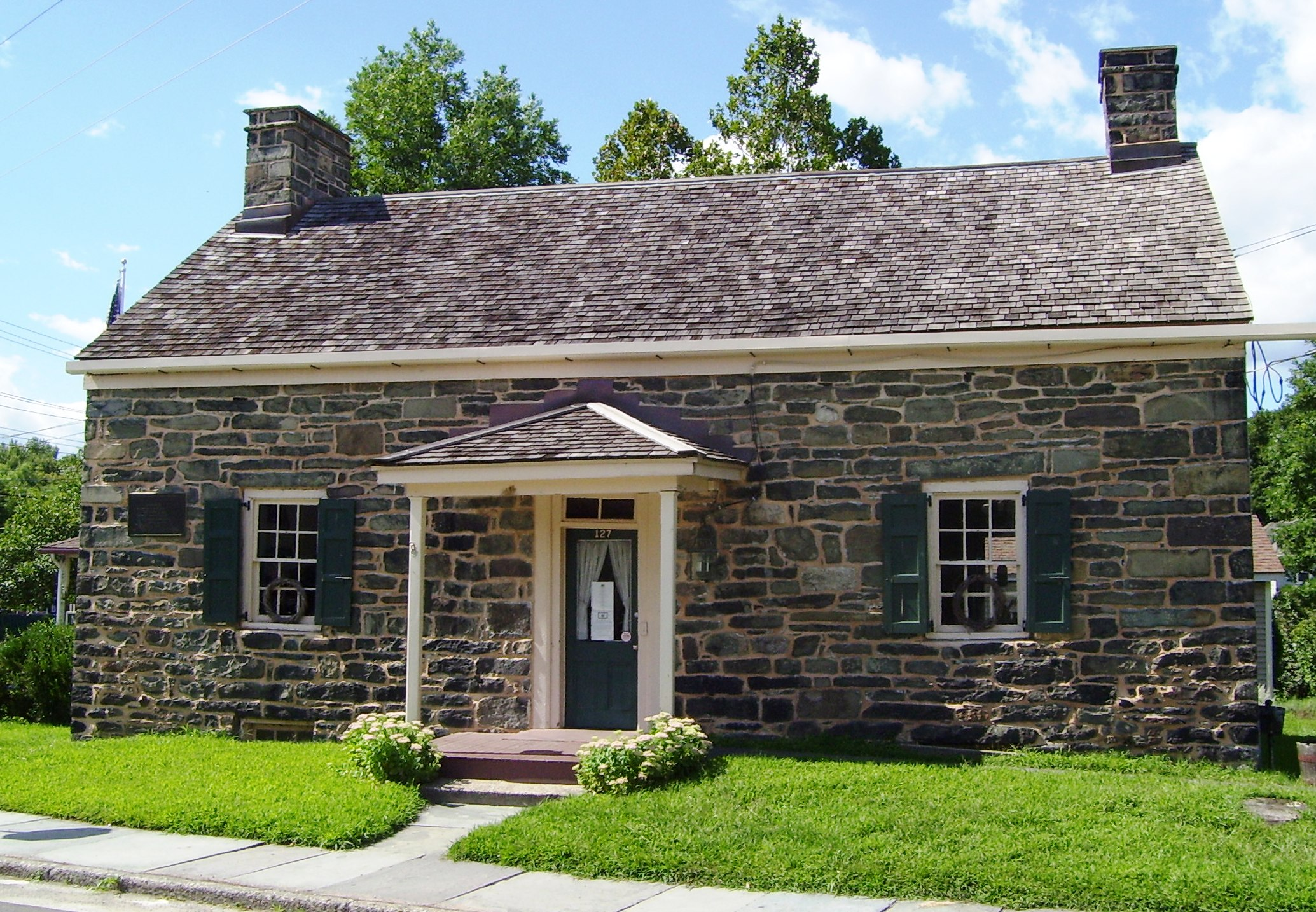
- (2011)
- Location: 127 W. Main St. Port Jervis, New York
- Coordinates: 41°22′43″N 74°42′07″W
- Built: 1793
- NRHP reference No.: 74001291
- Added to NRHP: June 13, 1974

"Fort Decker" is a stone house built in 1793 from the remains of the fort of that name. It is located on West Main Street in Port Jervis, New York, United States, the oldest building in that city, which it predates by several decades.

The original Fort Decker was built by a Frederick Haynes, a Dutch settler, sometime before 1760, during the French and Indian War, as an unofficial defense and trading post. It was one and a half stories high, built of stone and overlapping logs. Haynes left the area for New Jersey around 1775, leaving the fort to his wife's family, the Deckers. The fort is named for Lt. Martinus Decker, great grandson of Jan Gerritsen Decker, the first Decker to live in the Minisink Valley.

On July 19, 1779, during the Revolutionary War, when the settlement was known as "Peenpack", the fort was burned during a raid by pro-British Native American leader Joseph Brant. When survivors brought news of the disaster to Goshen, the Patriot attempt to retaliate led to a disastrous defeat at the Battle of Minisink, the only major engagement of the war in the upper Delaware Valley.

The current house was built from the remains of the fort in 1793. In 1826, it would house engineers working on the Delaware and Hudson Canal, including John Jervis, whom the city would later be renamed for. It remained in private hands as a residence from then on. In 1903, newspapers reported that the original roof was being removed, and in 1924 the building suffered partial damage from a fire.

As early as the 1880s, there had been interest in using the structure as a museum. This did not become possible until 1958, when the Minisink Valley Historical Society bought it for $1,000 and converted it into a museum. In 1974 it was listed on the National Register of Historic Places, the first of three buildings in Port Jervis to attain that distinction, the others being the Erie Depot and the Post Office.

== See also ==
- National Register of Historic Places listings in Orange County, New York
