= Pond Eddy, Pennsylvania =

Unincorporated community in Pennsylvania, US

- Unincorporated community
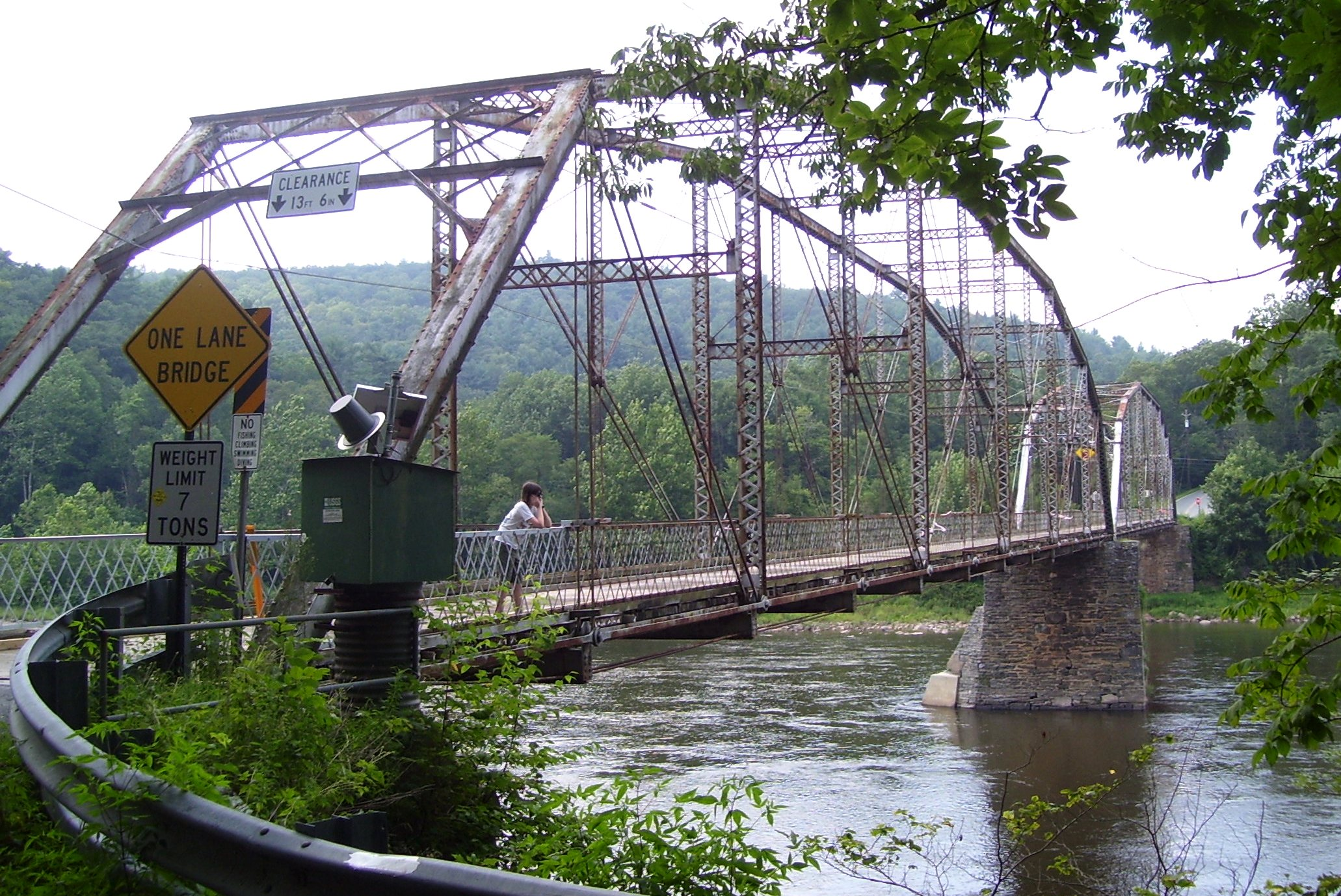
- The Pond Eddy Bridge

- Location within Pennsylvania
- Coordinates: 41°25′52″N 74°49′23″W
- Country: United States
- State: Pennsylvania
- County: Pike
- Elevation: 620 ft (190 m)
- Time zone: UTC-5 (Eastern (EST))
  - Summer (DST): UTC-4 (EDT)
- Area code: 570
- GNIS feature ID: 1199326

Pond Eddy is an unincorporated community in Shohola Township and Westfall Township, Pike County, Pennsylvania, United States.

The Pond Eddy Bridge, which is listed on the National Register of Historic Places, is located in Pond Eddy. The bridge crosses the Delaware River and connects the community to Lumberland, New York. As Pond Eddy has no road links to the rest of Pennsylvania, residents wishing to drive to other parts of the state must cross the bridge into New York first.

== See also ==
- Border irregularities of the United States
