= Battle of Minisink =

1779 battle of the American Revolution

Coordinates: 41°29′20″N 74°58′15″W

- Part of the American Revolutionary War
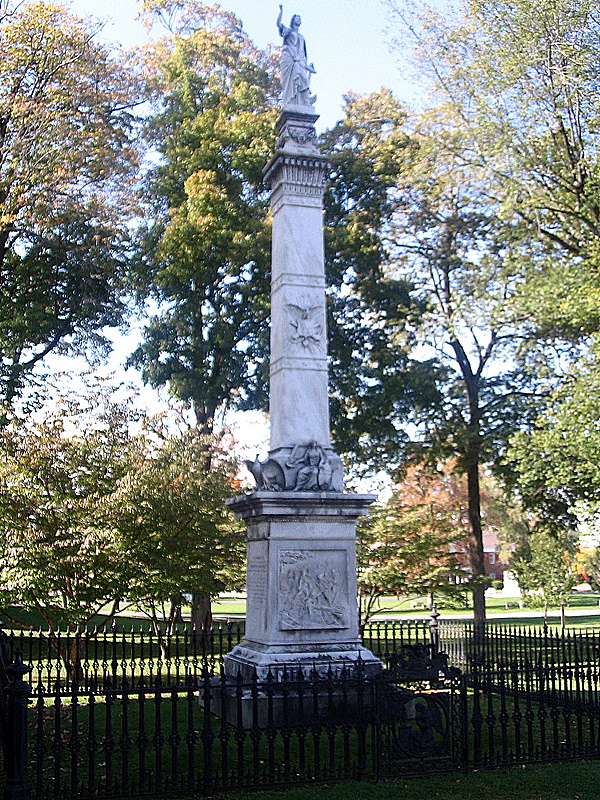
- Monument in Goshen, New York over mass grave of Minisink battle dead
Date	July 22, 1779
Location	Highland, Sullivan County, near Minisink Ford, New York
Result	Anglo-Haudenosaunee victory

Belligerents
United States	Great Britain; Haudenosaunee

Commanders and leaders
John Hathorn; Benjamin Tusten †	Joseph Brant

Strength
120 militia	60 Haudenosaunee; 27 Loyalists

Casualties and losses
46 killed 1 captured	3 killed 10 wounded

The Battle of Minisink took place during the American Revolutionary War at Minisink Ford, New York, on July 22, 1779. It was the only major skirmish of the Revolutionary War fought in the upper Delaware River valley. The battle was a decisive Haudenosaunee and Loyalist victory, as the Patriot militia was hastily assembled, ill-equipped and inexperienced.

== Brant's raid ==
Although British forces in the Northern Theater were largely concentrated in and near New York, Joseph Brant, a Mohawk war leader, had travelled to the upper Delaware Valley with his Loyalist and Indigenous volunteers to gather intelligence, seize cattle, and possibly disrupt American plans for an expedition against the Haudenosaunee.

In February 1779, Brigadier General Kazimierz Pulaski's infantry had been reassigned to the Southern Theater, leaving the upper Delaware River valley largely undefended. Brant led his volunteers towards Minisink with the goal of taking cattle and demoralizing the colonists.

When Brant's force of 60 Haudenosaunee and 27 Loyalists disguised as native warriors approached the settlement around noon on July 20, many of the settlers fled to the main fort. As a result only four settlers were killed and only three taken prisoner. Brant later explained in his report to Lieutenant Colonel Mason Bolton at Fort Niagara that "the reason that we could not take more of them was owing to the many forts about the place, into which they were always ready to run like ground-hogs." Ten houses, eleven barns, a church, and a gristmill were destroyed in the raid including the fortified house known as Fort Decker. Brant further reported that he had one man killed and one wounded in the attack, but stressed that they "did not in the least injure Women or Children."

== Battle of Minisink ==
Brant's raiders departed the settlement and headed upriver. Riders from Minisink headed to Goshen and reported the attack. The local militia mustered at Minisink early on July 21, under the command of Lieutenant Colonel Benjamin Tusten, and were joined by a detachment of militia from Sussex County, New Jersey. Tusten was opposed to pursuing Brant, and suggested waiting for reinforcements. Many of the assembled militiamen, however, dismissed the fighting ability of the Haudenosaunee and demanded immediate retribution. Outvoted, Tusten agreed to set out. They were later joined by elements of the 4th Orange County Militia Regiment from Warwick and led by Colonel John Hathorn. Colonel Hathorn assumed overall command and set off with the force of about 120 militiamen to intercept Brant.

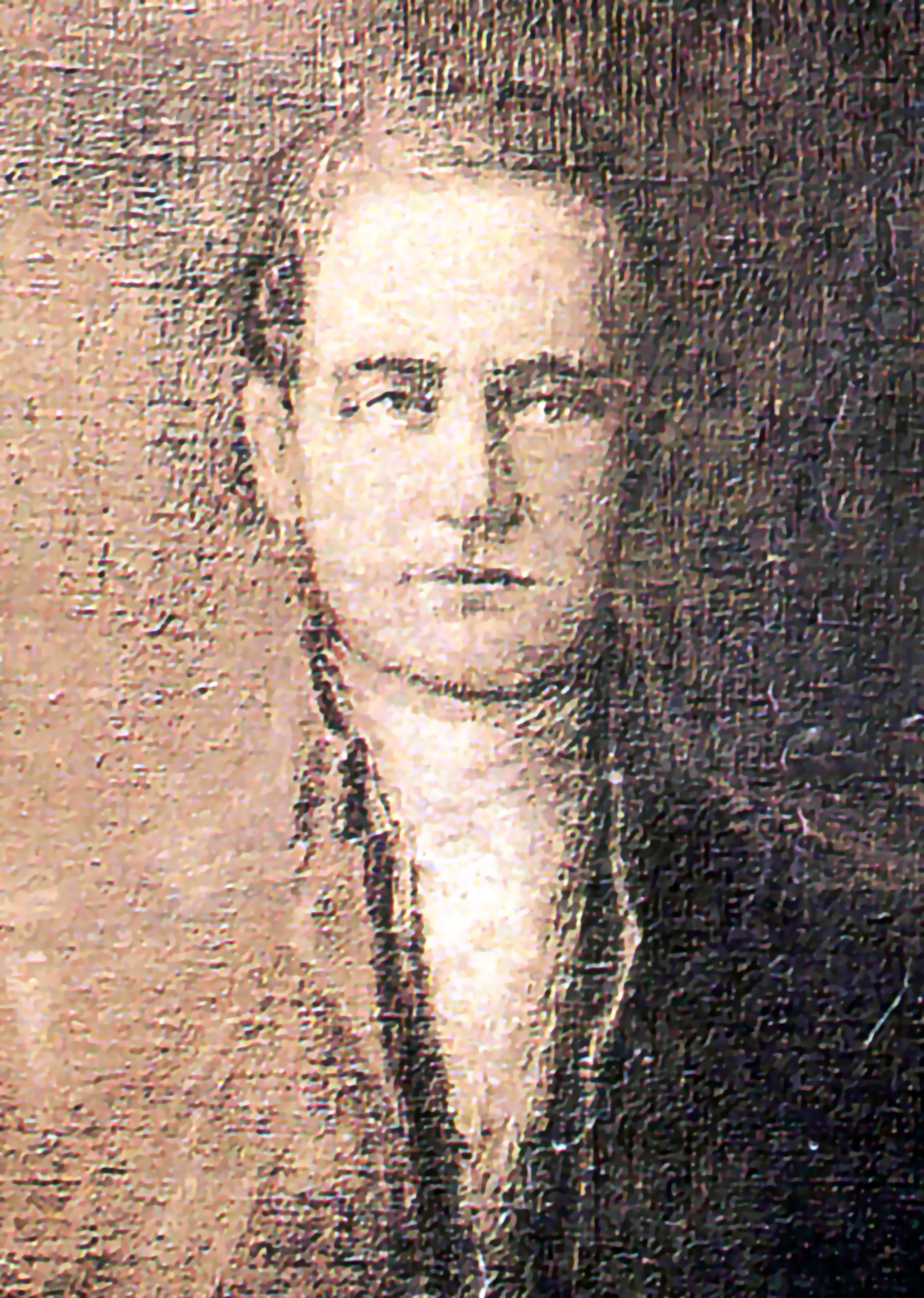
Colonel John Hathorn commanded the 4th Orange County MIlitia Regiment. This is a composite done in 1907. No known life portrait exists.

On the morning of July 22, the militia moved into position on a hill to the east of the confluence of the Lackawaxen and Delaware Rivers, intending to ambush Brant's forces as they crossed the Minisink Ford. Hathorn split his men into a group of skirmishers and two other groups comprising the main force. Before the ambush was fully set, however, an accidental rifle discharge alerted Brant to the trap. Brant quickly gained the higher ground to the rear of Hathorn's position and opened fire.

Hathorn was unable to regroup his men for a counterattack. Many of his men retreated, leaving the rest of the militia surrounded and outnumbered. After several hours of exchanging shots, ammunition began to run low, and the battle devolved into hand-to-hand combat. At least 46 militiamen were killed, including Tusten. Brant's men gave no quarter to the wounded and captured, however, one of the wounded, Captain John Wood, was spared because Brant mistakenly believed him to be a fellow Mason.

Brant lost only seven men. Brant wrote that three were killed during the battle, and that four were dangerously wounded and would probably not survive. Although badly wounded, Hathorn survived, returning to Warwick to write his report of the loss to his superiors.

== Aftermath ==
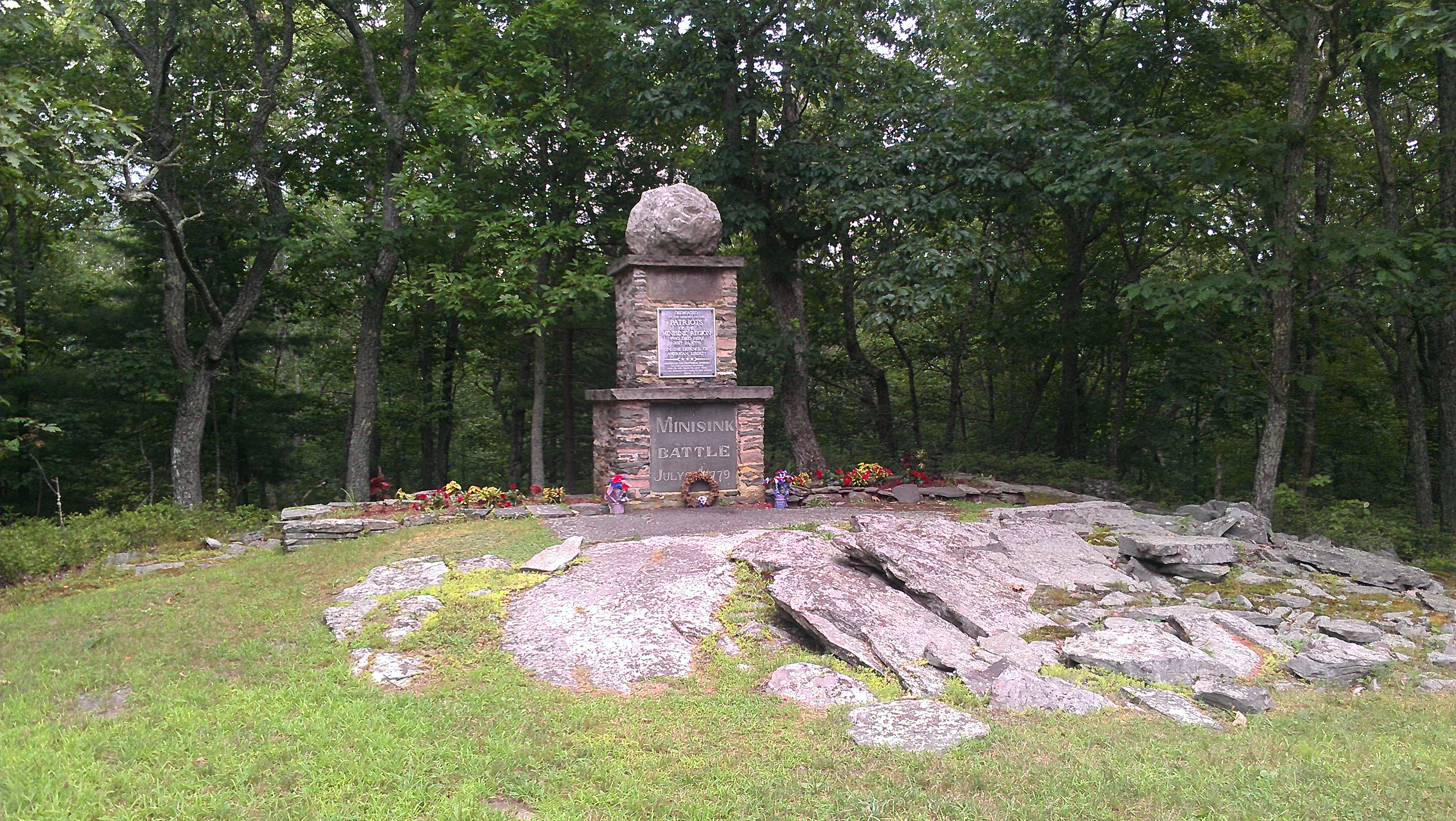
Monument at site of the battle, now part of the Minisink Battleground County Park.

After the battle, Brant and his men forded the Delaware and continued north to Onaquaga on the Susquehanna River.

The raid failed to disrupt the Sullivan Expedition. Several weeks later at the Battle of Newtown, Brant and his volunteers, along with Butler's Rangers and several hundred Seneca and Cayuga warriors were brushed aside by Major General John Sullivan and his 3200 Continental Army soldiers. Sullivan subsequently invaded the Haudenosaunee homeland in the Finger Lakes region of New York and destroyed 40 Haudenosaunee villages.

The inhabitants of the Precinct of Goshen (which preceded the forming of towns in Orange County) were unable to bury their dead for 43 years as the battlefield was too remote. Some of the soldiers' widows attempted the trip but were forced to turn back. In 1822, a committee was formed to travel to the battlefield and comb the area for remains. The few bones recovered were buried in a mass grave in Barryville but later moved to Goshen. A stone obelisk was erected at Goshen for the centennial of the battle, engraved with the names of the dead.

In 1847, a burial was discovered in Lackawaxen, Pennsylvania that is believed to be the remains of a casualty of the Battle of Minisink. The site now serves as a memorial tomb for unknown Revolutionary War soldiers.

Today, the site of the battle is located within Minisink Battleground County Park in Sullivan County a couple of miles north of the Hamlet of Barryville near the Roebling's Delaware Aqueduct. There are no structures contemporary to the battle, but the park contains several trails, monuments, picnic areas, and a visitors' center.
