= Gustavus Adolphus Neumann =

American journalist

Gustavus Adolphus Neumann, about 1860. Americanized name variations: Gustav Adolph Neumann; Gustav A. Newman; G. A. Neumann

Gustavus Adolphus Neumann (1807-1886) was an American newspaper editor.

He was born on May 20, 1807, in Görlitz on the Neisse River, Saxony. Neumann has been labeled "one of the ablest German-American editors" of his time. His editorials dealt with, among other topics, the Americanization of the immigrant, and expressed strong and clear ideas on the subject.

== Biography ==
He immigrated to the United States in 1834, entering the U.S. via the Port of Baltimore in October of that year. In November he went to New York City to fill the position of founding editor of the New Yorker Staats-Zeitung. The first issue was published about a month later, on Christmas Eve, 1834. He obtained sole ownership of the newspaper within a few years, possibly as early as 1837. That year he served as a delegate to a nationwide convention of German immigrants (held in Pittsburg) that considered the problems of adjusting to life in America.

As owner and editor of the New Yorker Staats-Zeitung, he built the paper from a weekly - printed on a manually operated Washington Hand Press - to a tri-weekly, and set the stage for daily publication. Although he sold ownership and publishing rights in 1845, just before the conversion to a daily, he continued as editor until 1853. The German-language paper eventually (in the 1870s) reached an audience comparable to New York City's English-language papers such as the New-York Tribune and the New York Times.

He entered government service in 1854, and from then until 1866 filled various positions in the New York Custom House. During this period, he purchased a farm in the hamlet of Swamp Mills, Town of Tusten, Sullivan County, New York, to which he moved in 1866. Through his efforts, a fourth-class post office was established at Swamp Mills in 1873. Neumann was appointed postmaster, and set up the office in a portion of his house at the intersection of the Neumann-McHugh Road and the Mt. Hope-Lumberland Turnpike.

He served as postmaster until he died on December 11, 1886, at Swamp Mills. His body was interred in the cemetery of the Ten Mile River Baptist Church, a historic building that was included in the National Register of Historic Places in 1997.
