= Tusten Stone Arch Bridge =

- U.S. National Register of Historic Places
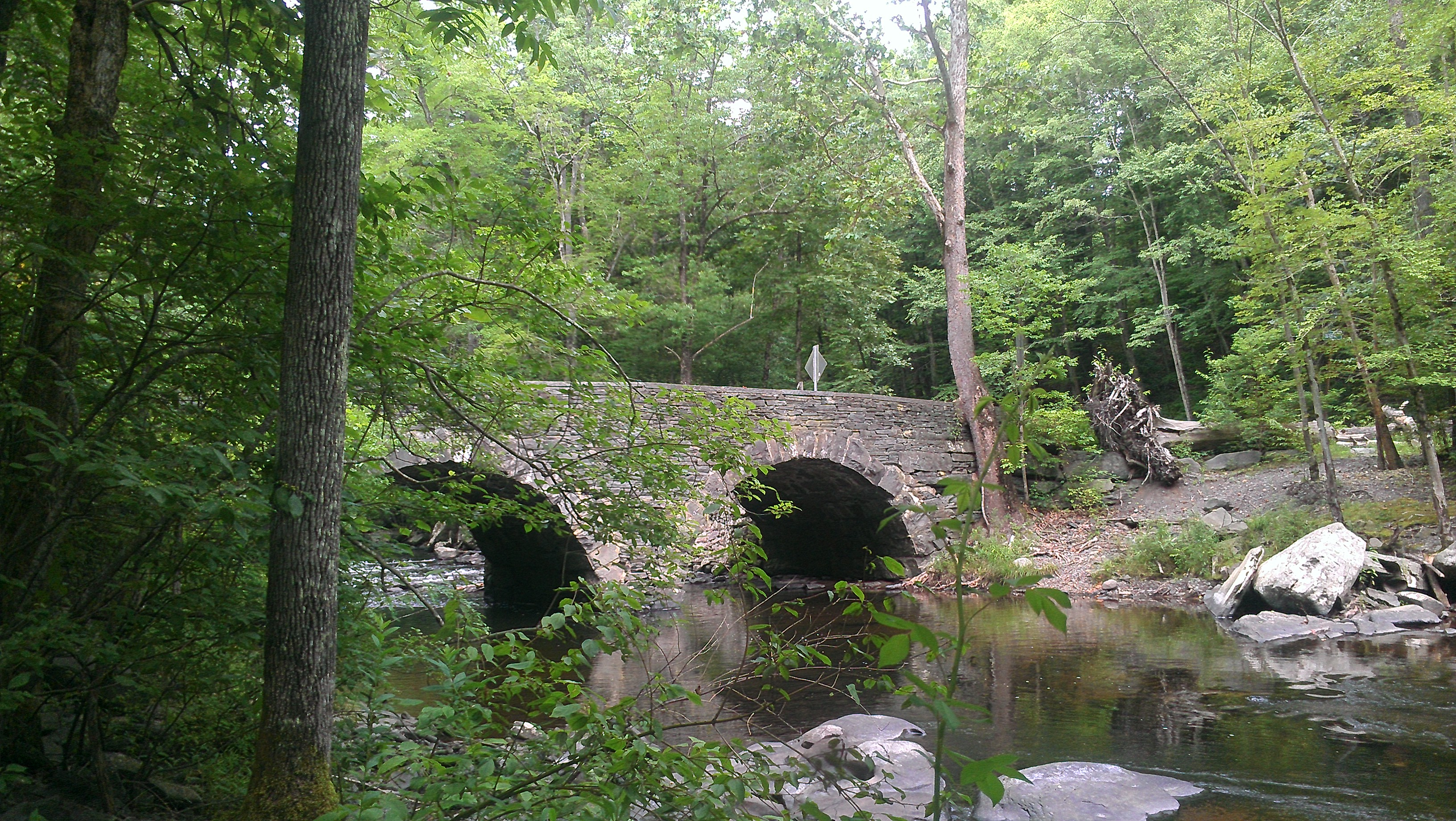
- The bridge viewed from the north side of the Ten Mile River

- Location within New York Location within the United States
- Nearest city: Tusten, New York
- Coordinates: 41°33′22″N 75°1′10″W
- Area: less than one acre
- Built: 1896
- Architect: Hankins, William H. and co.
- Architectural style: stone arch bridge
- MPS: Upper Delaware Valley, New York and Pennsylvania MPS
- NRHP reference No.: 00000839
- Added to NRHP: July 27, 2000

Tusten Stone Arch Bridge is a historic stone arch bridge located at Tusten in Sullivan County, New York. It was built in 1896 and has two round arches. It measures 51.1 feet in length and 15 feet wide. It crosses the Tenmile River near that river's junction with the Delaware River.

It was added to the National Register of Historic Places in 2000.

It is located within the Ten Mile River Boy Scout Reservation, which in turn is owned by the Boy Scout Councils of Greater New York.
