= Benjamin Tusten =

American physician and revolutionary militiaman (1743–1779)

no Benjamin Tusten
- Born: 11 December 1743
- Died: 22 July 1779 (aged 35) Minisink Ford, Sullivan County, New York U.S.
- Buried: Goshen, New York, U.S.
- Rank: Lieutenant colonel
- Conflicts: American Revolutionary War; Battle of Minisink

Benjamin Tusten (11 December 1743 – July 22, 1779) was a physician and a militia lieutenant colonel during the American Revolutionary War.

== Biography ==
"Doctor Benjamin Tusten was a native of Southhold, on Long Island. He was born on the 11th December, 1743, and was the only son of Colonel Benjamin Tusten Sr, a respectable farmer of that place. His father removed into Orange county, in the year 1746, bringing with him his son, and settled on the banks of the Otterkill, two and a half miles from the village of Goshen, on the patent granted to Madame Elizabeth Denn. Such was the respect in which the father was held, that he was soon appointed one of the judges of the county court, and promoted a colonel in the regiment of militia on the west side of the mountain, including at that time all the county of Orange, north of the Highlands, from Hudson's river to the line of New Jersey. His son Benjamin he had intended for a farmer, being then in possession of a large tract of land; but not being of a hardy constitution, he relinquished that design, and determined to fit him for a profession. For that purpose he sent him to an academy to obtain a classical education, at Jamaica, Long Island, there being none in Orange county; there he obtained a thorough acquaintance with the mathematics, and a good knowledge of the Latin and Greek languages. At the age of nineteen he returned, and commenced the study of medicine with Doctor Thomas Wickham, of Goshen, whose character as a physician and teacher of medicine stood unrivaled in his day. Medical books at that time, were difficult to be procured - none were published in this country, and as they were bought only by one profession, importations of them were scarce; indeed, most of the physicians imported their own libraries. From this circumstance the libraries of physicians were small, especially those who resided so far back in the country. This induced young Tusten, at the end of a year, to leave Doctor Wickham, and go to Newark, New Jersey, where he spent another year with Doctor Burnet. Here he became acquainted with a Miss Brown, whom he afterwards married. There were at that time no medical schools in this country, and he was induced to finish his education with Doctor Thomas Jones, a celebrated surgeon in the city of New York. In 1769 he returned home and commenced the practice of physic at the house of his father. Although he had availed himself of every opportunity of acquiring medical knowledge which the times would allow him, yet he commenced practice under unfavorable circumstances, - within three miles of his first preceptor, Doctor John Gale, in the village of Goshen, (if village it might then be called) and Doctor Pierson, in the East Division, not three miles distant, all of whom had their friends and employers; he performed some operations in surgery which gave him a degree of celebrity, (Doctor Gale being the only one who pretended to do anything in surgery). Doctor Tusten was mild, modest and unassuming in his manners, pleasant to his patients, and affable with all; he was also well acquainted with all improvements in surgery up to his time, which gave him a decided advantage over his competitor in that department of science. "Inoculation for small-pox had never been practiced in this country; indeed it was violently opposed and never resorted to but when circumstances had rendered it imperiously necessary. Doctor Tusten commenced inoculation in the year 1770. For this purpose he hired four houses in as many neighborhoods, where he inoculated about eight hundred persons, with such success as entirely to destroy the prejudices of the people against it. He kept these houses two years, after which inoculation was admitted into private families, and pock-houses were considered no longer necessary. He continued the practice of physic with success and deserved reputation, until the year 1779. During this time he married Miss Brown, by whom he had two sons and three daughters. "In the year 1775, the discontent which had long rankled in the bosoms of Americans, began to break out in open opposition to the British government. Their cruel and oppressive measures in regard to these colonies became matters of serious complaint, and excited a spirit of resistance, which called forth the energies of all citizens, who had a just sense of the injuries they had received, and of the duties they owed their country. Doctor Tusten early evinced a spirit becoming a freeman; he took a decided part in favor of the revolution, which had at that time just begun to unfold itself; he risked his all in support of that declaration, wherein the signers pledged to each other and to their country, their lives, their fortunes, and their sacred honor; and he redeemed that pledge by the sacrifice of his own life. By riding and exercise he had become more healthy; active and enterprising, he had gained the confidence of his countrymen. In 1777, he was appointed Lieutenant Colonel of the Goshen Regiment of Militia, under General Allison, and in 1778, he was appointed a Surrogate of Orange county, which office he held at the time of his death." – [Address of Doctor David R. Arnell before the Medical Society of Orange county, July 4, 1820.

== American Revolutionary War ==
In 1779, lieutenant colonel Tusten led a group of militia against Joseph Brant at the Battle of Minisink. On July 20, Joseph Brant, a Mohawk chief and commissioned officer in the British army, led a strong party of Indians to raid Minisink and the surrounding valley settlements. They by-passed the blockhouses set up for defense and burned over 20 buildings, killing and capturing civilians. The militia of Goshen, NY, led by Col. Tusten marched to Minisink to help the inhabitants, where he was joined by the neighboring Sussex county, NJ, militia company led by Major Samuel Meeker, both groups gathering together on July 21. Together they had about 149 men. They held a council of war to consider pursuit (The Indians were driving cattle and horses, and could be caught.), but Tusten believed the Indians outnumbered the militia by odds of two to one, so advised against attacking the retreating enemy and to wait for reinforcements from the Continental Army. Many others were insistent for immediate pursuit and attack. Finally, Maj. Meeker mounted up and waved his sword, saying "Let the brave men follow me: the cowards may stay behind!" The council stopped debating the issue and decided to go on the march through the night. The battle unfolded just as Tusten had predicted. The militia was over run by Brant's superior forces. At the end of the battle a mortally wounded Col Hathorne was in retreat and leaving the battlefield when he stopped to tell the wounded Tusten to save himself and leave the battle, the enemy had breached the lines and his position would be over run. Tusten refused to leave his wounded men and was killed with a tomahawk to the head. Samuel Meeker was wounded at the battle and left for home.

== Legacy ==
He left behind five children, one of whom, James, served as a major in the War of 1812. His wife was named Ann Brown and had two daughters with her Sarah Tusten and Abigail Tusten Reeve.

The town of Tusten, New York is named for him. There is also street in Goshen, NY named after him – Tusten Ave. The Tusten Cup (coffe shop) is also named after him located in Narrowsburg
