= Minisink Ford, New York =

Minisink Ford
- hamlet
- Location within the state of New York
- Coordinates: 41°28′57″N 74°58′37″W
- Country: United States
- State: New York
- County: Sullivan
- Elevation: 860 ft (260 m)
- Time zone: UTC-5 (Eastern (EST))
  - Summer (DST): UTC-4 (EDT)
- GNIS feature ID: 972805

Minisink Ford is a hamlet on the Delaware River, fifteen miles northwest of Port Jervis. It is in the town of Highland, Sullivan County, New York, United States.

== History ==
"Minisink" once referred to a vast area stretching all the way from Minisink Ford to the Delaware Water Gap. In 1800, the Town of Minisink was given its present boundaries, thirty miles southwest of Minisink Ford.

During the American Revolution in 1779, Minisink Ford was the site of the Battle of Minisink, in which 40–50 settlers were killed in an engagement with a band of Iroquois and Loyalists under Mohawk chief and Colonel Joseph Brant. The Minisink Battlefield was listed on the National Register of Historic Places in 1993.

In 1827, the Delaware and Hudson Canal began operating between Honesdale, Pennsylvania and Kingston, New York. In its time, the canal company was the largest private commercial enterprise in the nation. Roebling's Delaware Aqueduct was constructed in 1848 as part of the canal, between Lackawaxen, Pennsylvania and Minisink Ford. It was designed by and built under the supervision of John A. Roebling, who would design the Brooklyn Bridge twenty years later. Portions of the Canal, including the Delaware Aqueduct, were designated a National Historic Landmark in 1968. The aqueduct has been restored and is now preserved by the National Park Service.
