= Roebling's Delaware Aqueduct =

Bridge in New York and Pennsylvania

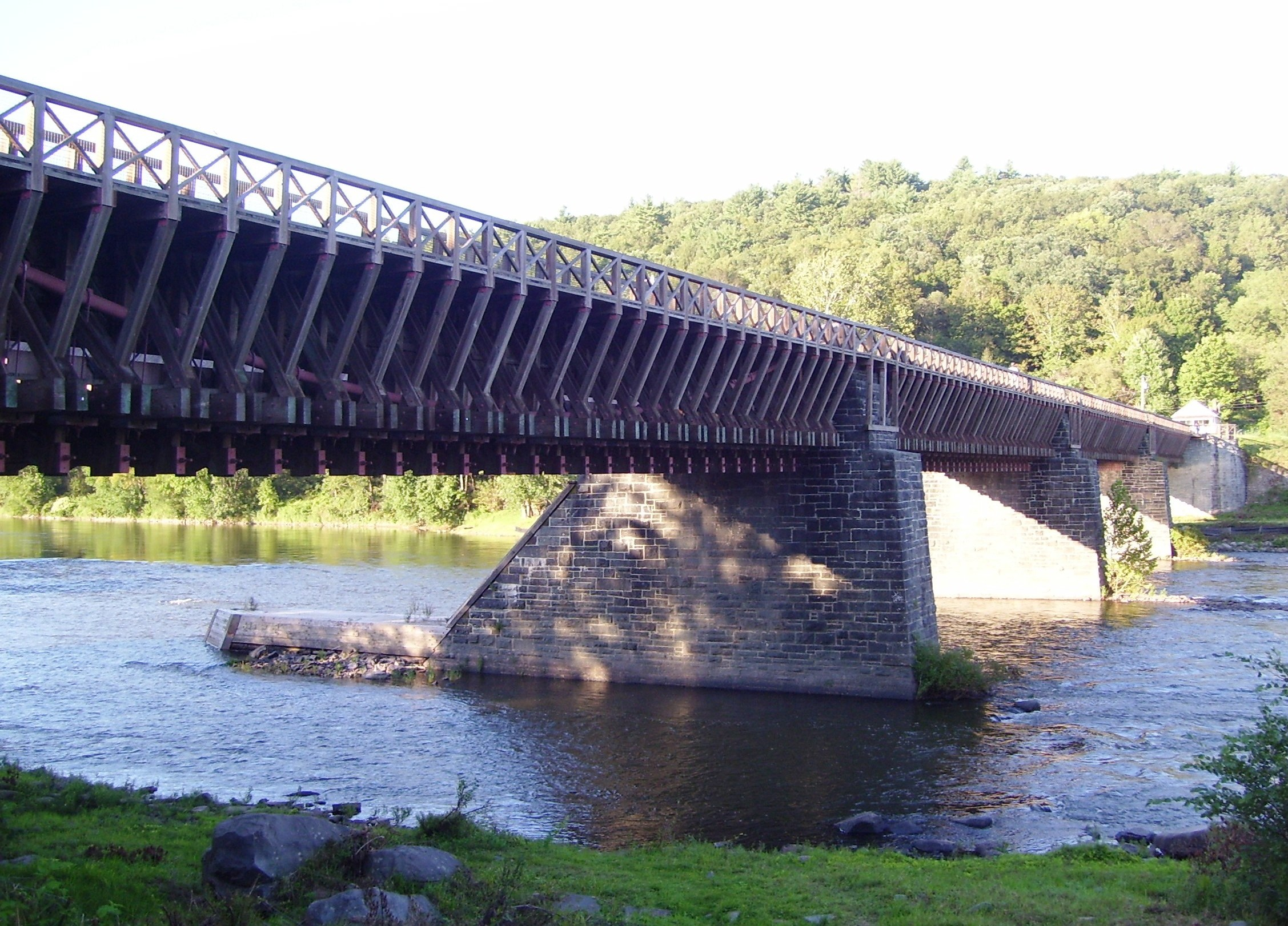
- The restored bridge, in 2011
- Coordinates: 41°28′57″N 74°59′04″W
- Delaware Aqueduct
- U.S. National Register of Historic Places
- Location within Pennsylvania
- Location: Between Minisink Ford, New York and Lackawaxen, Pennsylvania
- Area: 1 acre (0.40 ha)
- Built: 1847
- Architect: Roebling, John A.
- NRHP reference No.: 68000055
- Added to NRHP: November 24, 1968
- Carries: Motor vehicles, pedestrians
- Crosses: Delaware River
- Locale: Minisink Ford, New York to Lackawaxen, Pennsylvania
- Other name: Roebling Bridge
- Maintained by: National Park Service

Characteristics
- Design: Suspension bridge
- Total length: 535 feet (163 m)

History
- Opened: 1849

Location
- Interactive map of Roebling's Delaware Aqueduct

Roebling's Delaware Aqueduct, also known as the Roebling Bridge, is the oldest existing wire suspension bridge in the United States. It runs 535 feet (163 meters) over the Delaware River, from Minisink Ford, New York, to Lackawaxen, Pennsylvania. Opened in 1849 as an aqueduct connecting two parts of the Delaware & Hudson Canal (D&H), it has since been converted to carry automotive traffic and pedestrians.

== Construction ==
The bridge begun in 1847 as one of four suspension aqueducts on the D&H Canal, a system of transportation connecting the coal fields of northeastern Pennsylvania with markets on the Hudson River. The canal opened in 1828, was enlarged after the 1840s, and closed in 1898.

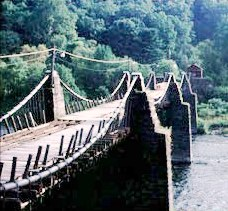
The bridge before restoration. The suspension cables are hidden in the restored aqueduct by the canal sides

Russell F. Lord and John A. Roebling designed the bridge and supervised its construction.

Two important local industries with conflicting needs brought about construction of Roebling's Delaware and Lackawaxen Aqueducts: canal traffic and timber rafting. Since the mid-18th century, timber from the Delaware valley had been floated down the river to shipyards and industries in Trenton and Philadelphia. The D&H Canal's rope ferry crossing of the Delaware at Lackawaxen created a bottleneck, and there were numerous collisions with timber rafts headed downstream. In 1846, to alleviate both problems, the D&H Canal Company approved Russell F. Lord's plan to substitute two new aqueducts in place of the rope ferry.

After evaluating several options, Lord recommended designs submitted by John A. Roebling, who had already built a wire suspension aqueduct at Pittsburgh in 1845. To raise the canal enough to allow the passage of ice floes and river traffic, Lord's plan called for three locks to be built on the eastern side.

An immediate success, the Delaware Aqueduct — which cost $41,750 – and the Lackawaxen Aqueduct — which cost $18,650, and of which only the abutments remain – reduced canal travel time by one full day, saving thousands of dollars annually.

== Post-construction history ==
After the canal closed in 1898, the aqueduct was drained and converted into a vehicular bridge. Eventually, the canal sides and towpaths (walkways for those pulling barges) were removed. It operated as a toll bridge for wagons and, later, motor vehicles until 1979.

Portions of the D&H Canal, including the Delaware Aqueduct, were designated a National Historic Landmark in 1968. The Delaware Aqueduct was also designated by the American Society of Civil Engineers as a National Historic Civil Engineering Landmark in 1972.

The National Park Service bought the bridge in 1980. The agency rebuilt the bridge's superstructure from Roebling's original plans and specification in 1986, and in 1995, the wooden icebreakers, towpaths and aqueduct walls were reconstructed, restoring the bridge's original appearance as an aqueduct. The bridge is now part of the Upper Delaware Scenic and Recreational River.

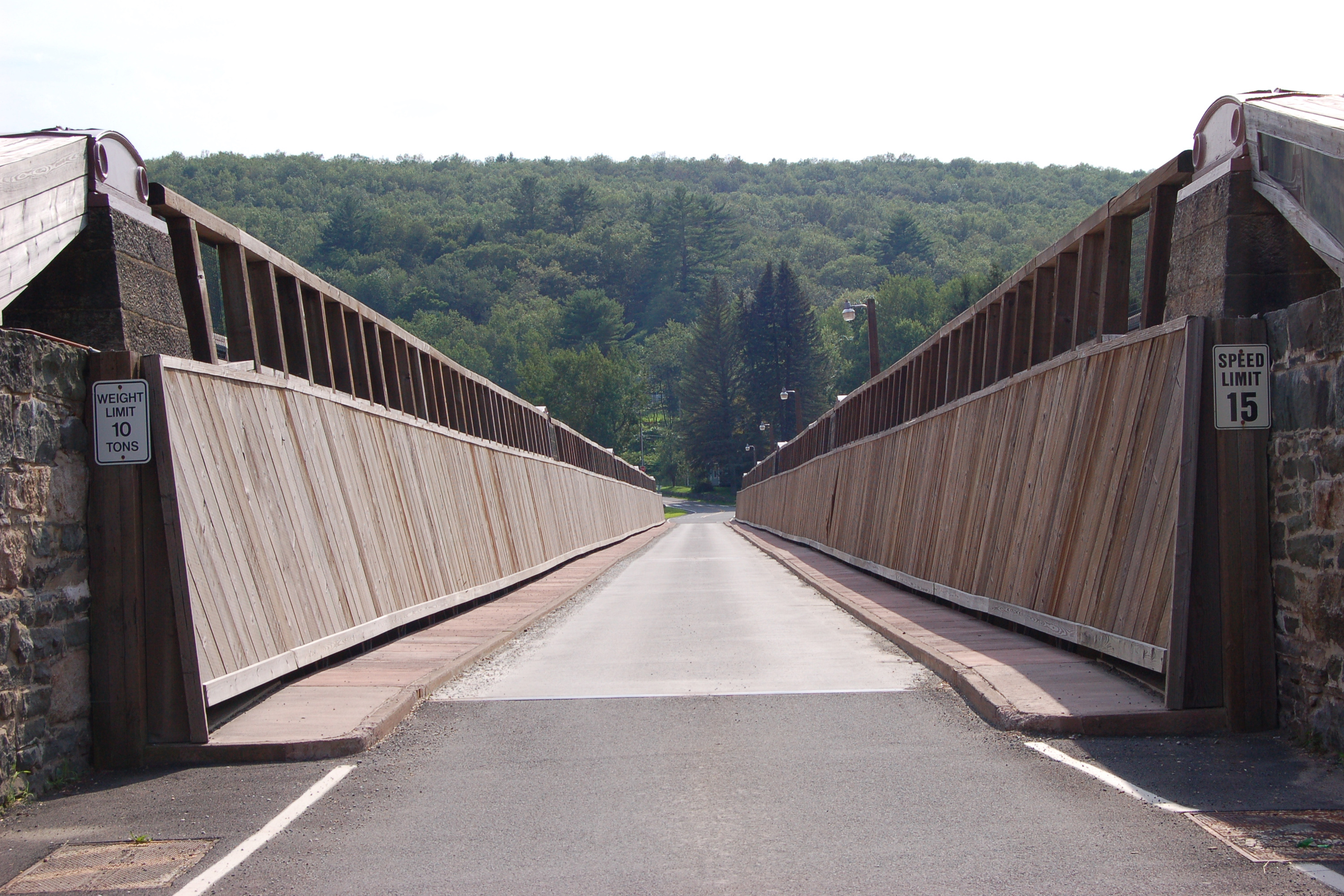
A view down the one-lane bridge

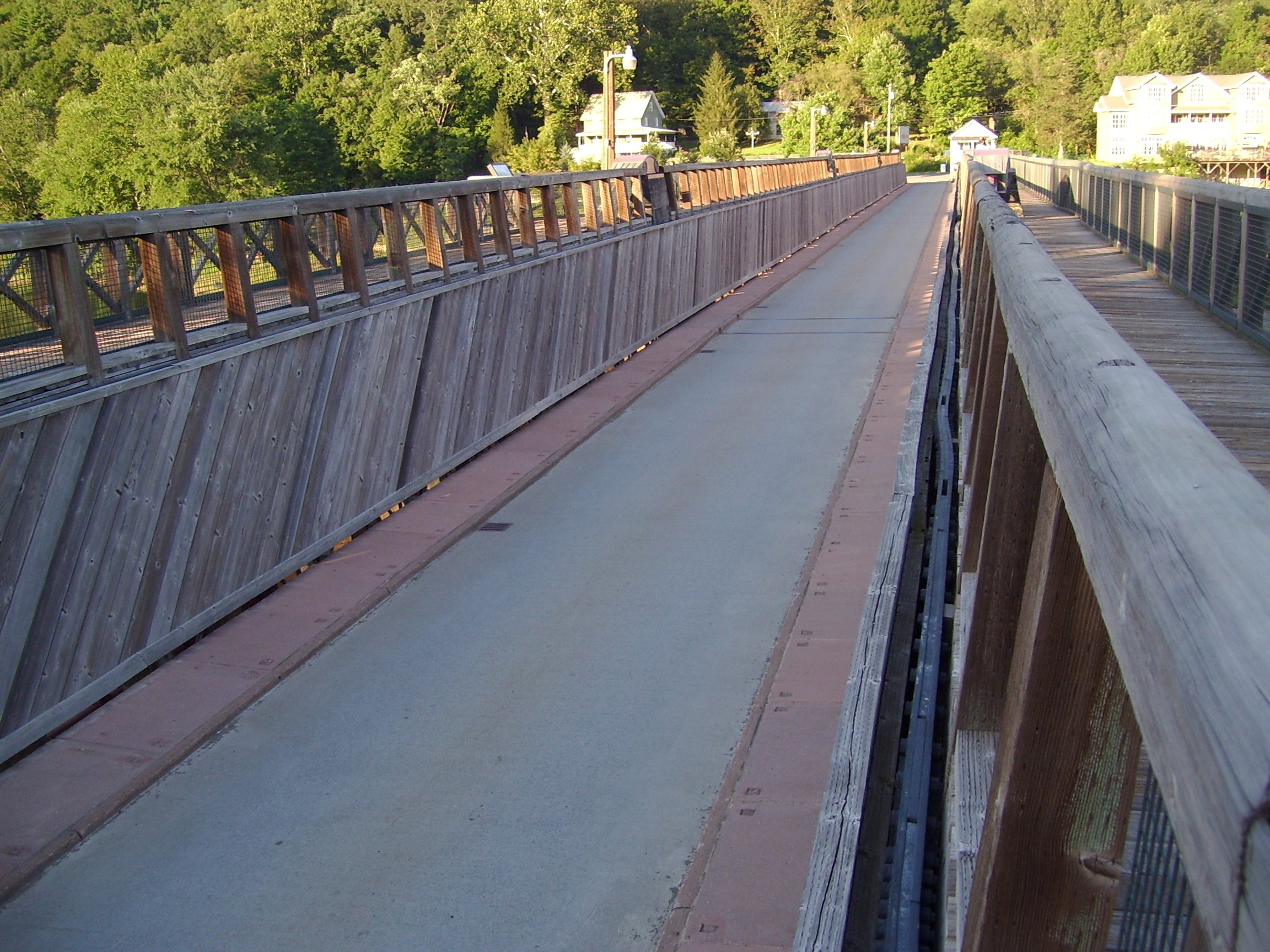
The interior of the bridge

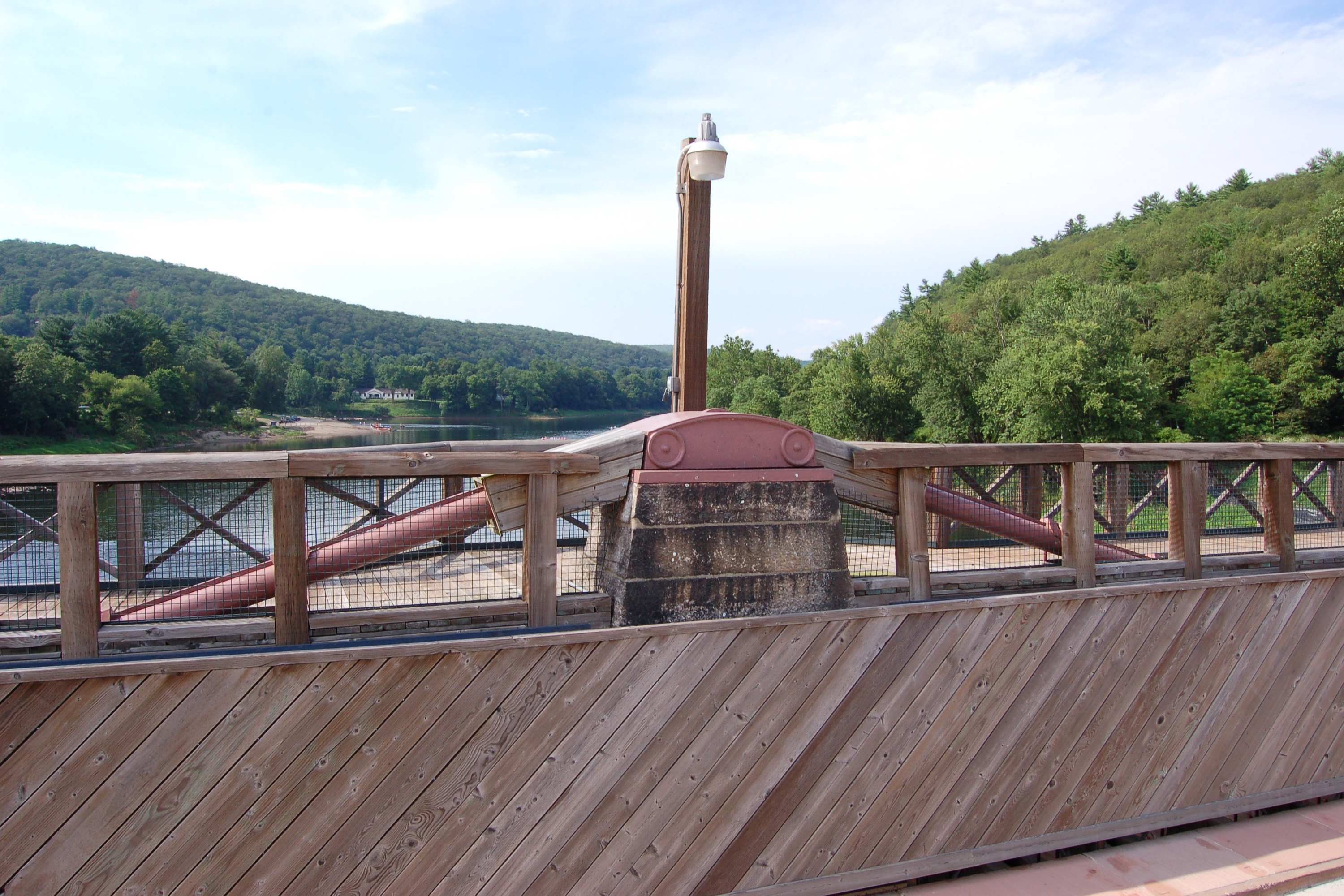
The visible cables of the suspension bridge

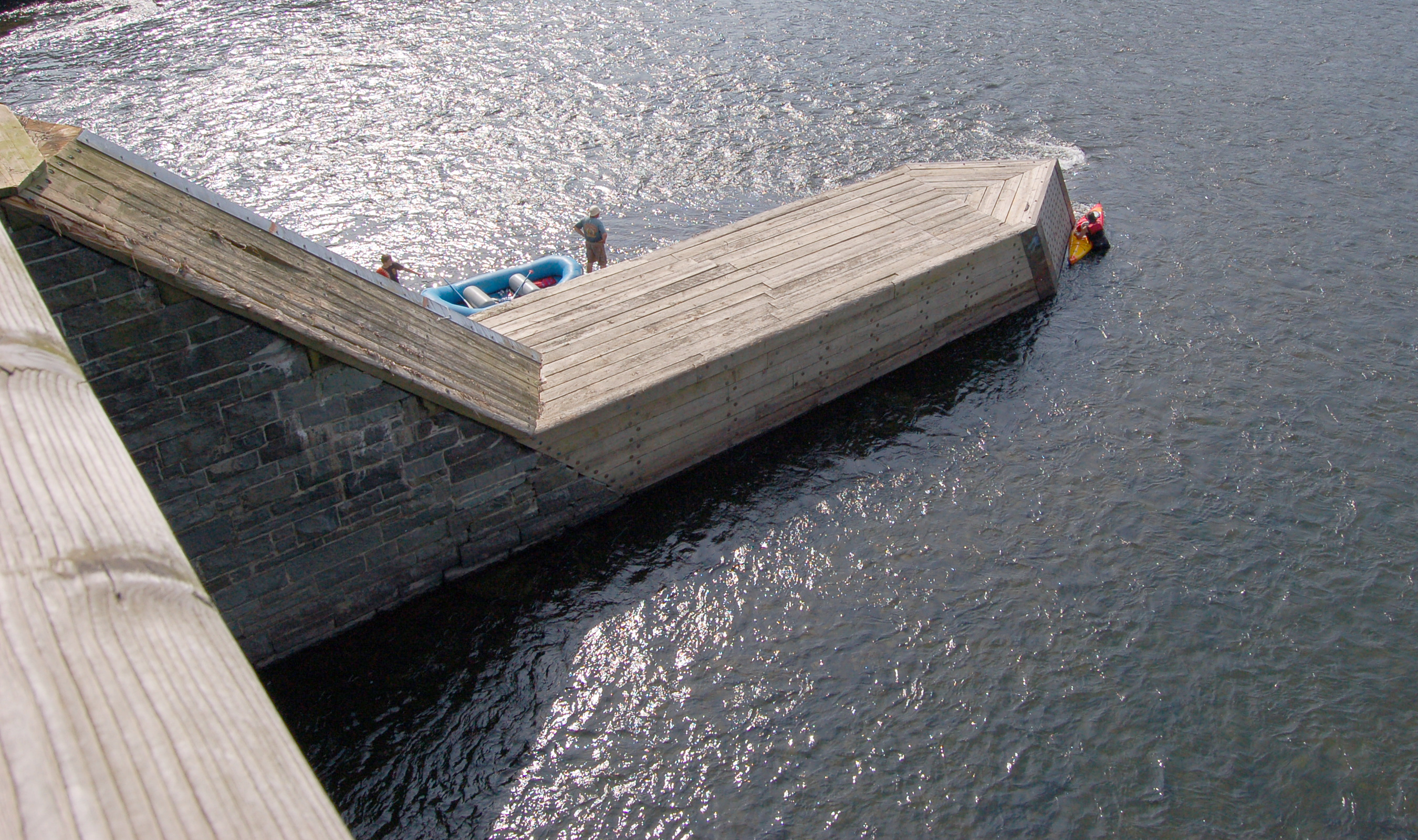
This bridge pier is designed to break ice flowing downstream

== See also ==
- John A. Roebling Suspension Bridge, in Cincinnati
- List of bridges documented by the Historic American Engineering Record in New York
- List of bridges documented by the Historic American Engineering Record in Pennsylvania
- List of crossings of the Delaware River
- National Register of Historic Places listings in Pike County, Pennsylvania
- National Register of Historic Places listings in Sullivan County, New York
