= Eldred, New York =

- Hamlet and CDP
- Location within New York Location within the United States
- Coordinates: 41°31′37″N 74°53′03″W
- Country: United States
- State: New York
- County: Sullivan

Area
  - Total: 1.30 sq mi (3.36 km^{2})
- Elevation: 971 ft (296 m)
- Time zone: UTC-5 (Eastern (EST))
  - Summer (DST): UTC-4 (EDT)
- ZIP code: 12732
- Area code: 845
- GNIS feature ID: 2806963

Eldred is a rural hamlet (and census-designated place) located in the central part of the town of Highland, Sullivan County, New York, United States. The community is located along New York State Route 55, approximately 4 miles (6.4 km) north of the Pennsylvania border and 13.5 miles (21.7 km) southwest of Monticello. As of the 2020 census, Eldred had a population of 212. Eldred has a post office which opened on October 5, 1831, with the ZIP code 12732. Public education in Eldred is serviced through the Eldred Central School District.
