= Utica, Chenango and Susquehanna Valley Railway =

Overview
- Parent company: Delaware, Lackawanna and Western Railroad (1870–1945)
- Dates of operation: 1866–1945
- Successor: Delaware, Lackawanna and Western Railroad

Technical
- Track gauge: 1,435 mm (4 ft 8 1/2 in)
- Length: 97.6 miles (157.1 km)

The Utica, Chenango and Susquehanna Valley Railway was formed in 1866 and came under the Delaware, Lackawanna and Western Railroad in 1870.
