= Pond Eddy, New York =

Hamlet in Sullivan County town of Lumberland

- Hamlet
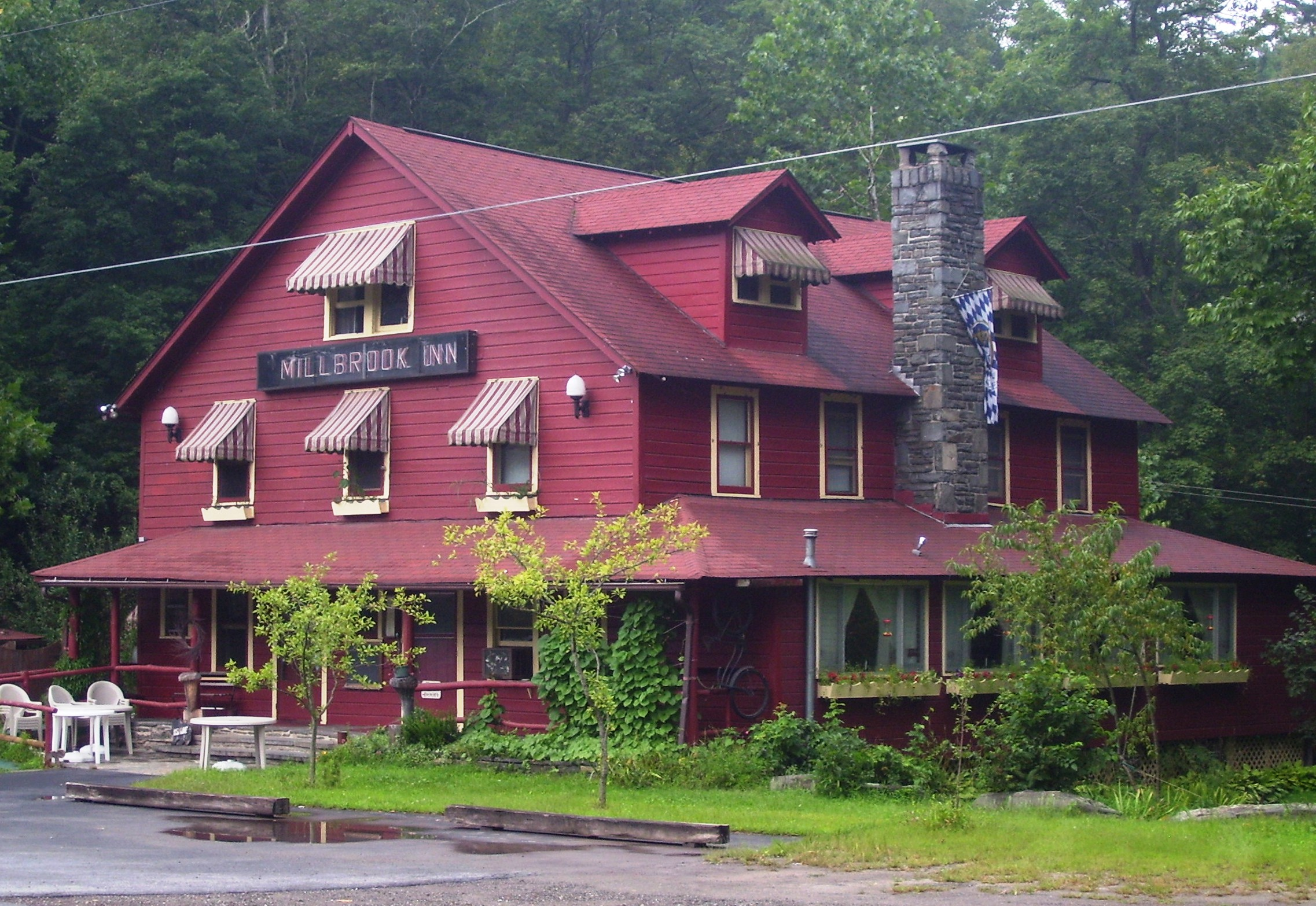
- Millbrook Inn in Pond Eddy

- Location within New York Location within the United States
- Coordinates: 41°26′25″N 74°49′24″W
- Country: United States
- State: New York
- County: Sullivan
- Elevation: 554 ft (169 m)
- Time zone: UTC-5 (Eastern (EST))
  - Summer (DST): UTC-4 (EDT)
- ZIP code: 12770
- Area code: 845
- GNIS feature ID: 960889

Pond Eddy is a hamlet in Sullivan County town of Lumberland, New York, United States. It is located along the Delaware River, marking the border between New York and Pennsylvania.

== Population ==
As of the latest census, Pond Eddy is sparsely populated, reflecting its rural nature. Most of its residents are year-round inhabitants, although the area does attract seasonal visitors and second-home owners, especially during the summer months. The community is known for its tight-knit nature, with a few small businesses and local establishments catering to both residents and tourists. The population of the town of Lumberland is around 2,400.

== Wildlife and ecology ==
The Delaware River and its surrounds provide habitats to several animal species. Common wildlife includes white-tailed deer, black bears, and red foxes. The hamlet is part of an important migratory route for birds, including the blackpoll warbler and the peregrine falcon. The river itself is home to brook trout, a native species prized by anglers.

Pond Eddy's flora is also diverse. Native plant species such as common milkweed, purple coneflower, New York fern, and eastern red cedar thrive in the area, supporting various pollinators like bees and butterflies. The region is also home to endangered plants such as the white milkweed and the pink lady slipper orchid.

The Delaware River flows through Pond Eddy. The river is part of the Upper Delaware Scenic and Recreational River, a federally protected area that serves as a haven for wildlife. Bald eagles, once endangered, are now frequently seen soaring above the river, and the water is home to several species of fish, including trout, bass, and shad. This section of the Delaware River is known for its clean environment. Another formerly endangered species is the timber rattlesnake.

Based on the Köppen climate classification system, Pond Eddy, NY falls into the Humid Continental climate zone, specifically designated as Dfb.,
