= Highland, Sullivan County, New York =

Town of Highland
- Town
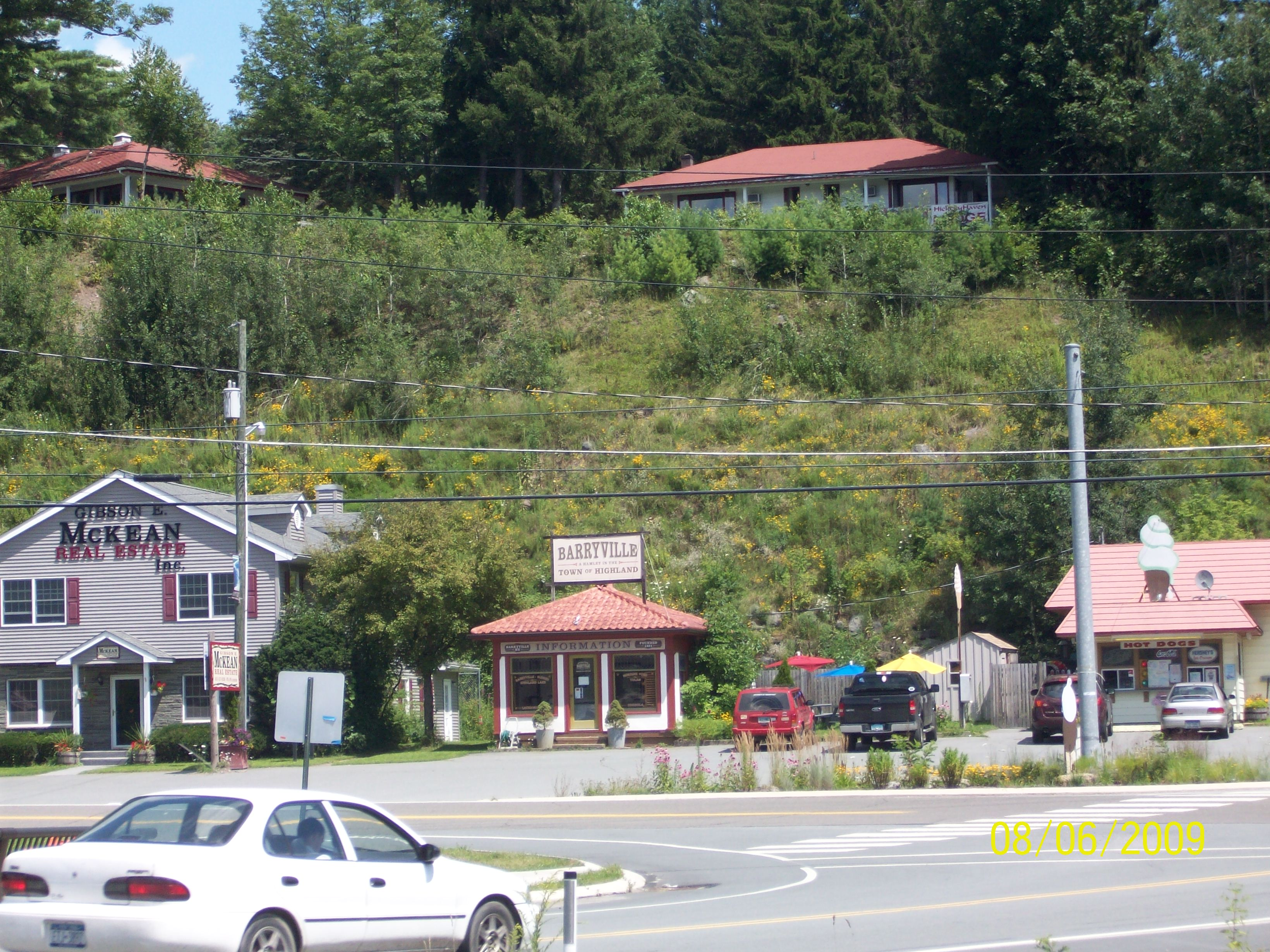
- Downtown Highland

- Location within New York
- Coordinates: 41°28′23″N 74°54′3″W
- Country: United States
- State: New York
- County: Sullivan

Government
  - Town Supervisor: John Pizzolato

Area
  - Total: 52 sq mi (134 km^{2})
  - Land: 50 sq mi (129 km^{2})
  - Water: 1.7 sq mi (4.4 km^{2})

Population (2020)
  - Total: 2,196
  - Density: 44.1/sq mi (17.0/km^{2})
- Time zone: UTC-5 (Eastern (EST))
  - Summer (DST): UTC-4 (EDT)

Highland is a town in Sullivan County, New York, United States. The population was 2,196 at the 2020 census. The town's name denotes its location on elevated ground north of the Delaware River. The town is in the southwestern part of the county.

== History ==
The town was formed from the Town of Lumberland in 1853. Barryville is named for William T. Barry, postmaster general under President Andrew Jackson. The community grew up around the Delaware and Hudson Canal, which opened in 1828 and operated until 1898. The canal ran through what is today the center of the hamlet, and the canal company operated a number of stores, an office and a dry dock there.

The Delaware River also served as the conduit for timber cut in the area and rafted to Philadelphia for use in the ship building industry. Men made fortunes in the timber business, and when the industry died in the middle of the 19th century, many river communities died with it. In fact, writing in 1899, John Willard Johnston, lawyer, historian, and the town of Highland's first supervisor, predicted a dire future for Barryville.

"Barryville is a small, poor village now," he wrote, "but at one time supported an active business. The lumber of the region being exhausted, the business of canaling declining and now abandoned, it has for the last 25 years been waning, until now it seems to have reached a bottom of hardpan. Human imagination can hardly reach anything in the future likely to improve it; but it will probably remain indefinitely the small poor place it now is."

== Geography ==
The southwestern town line, marked by the Delaware River, is the border of Pennsylvania.

According to the United States Census Bureau, the town has a total area of 51.7 square miles (134 km^{2}), of which 50.0 square miles (129 km^{2}) is land and 1.7 square miles (4.4 km^{2}) (3.25%) is water.

== Demographics ==
Historical population
Census	Pop.	Note	%±
1860	993		—
1870	958		−3.5%
1880	1,013		5.7%
1890	979		−3.4%
1900	964		−1.5%
1910	1,031		7.0%
1920	875		−15.1%
1930	880		0.6%
1940	1,038		18.0%
1950	1,140		9.8%
1960	1,138		−0.2%
1970	1,377		21.0%
1980	1,878		36.4%
1990	2,147		14.3%
2000	2,407		12.1%
2010	2,530		5.1%
2020	2,196		−13.2%
U.S. Decennial Census

As of the census of 2000, there were 2,404 people, 951 households, and 646 families residing in the town. The population density was 48.1 inhabitants per square mile (18.6/km^{2}). There were 1,558 housing units at an average density of 31.2 per square mile (12.0/km^{2}). The racial makeup of the town was 93.93% White, 3.29% African American, 0.29% Native American, 0.42% Asian, 0.37% Pacific Islander, 0.92% from other races, and 0.79% from two or more races. Hispanic or Latino of any race were 3.95% of the population.

There were 951 households, out of which 28.8% had children under the age of 18 living with them, 56.3% were married couples living together, 7.8% had a female householder with no husband present, and 32.0% were non-families. 28.6% of all households were made up of individuals, and 12.1% had someone living alone who was 65 years of age or older. The average household size was 2.38 and the average family size was 2.89.

In the town, the population was spread out, with 22.3% under the age of 18, 5.4% from 18 to 24, 25.8% from 25 to 44, 29.5% from 45 to 64, and 17.1% who were 65 years of age or older. The median age was 43 years. For every 100 females, there were 99.5 males. For every 100 females age 18 and over, there were 98.5 males.

The median income for a household in the town was $40,676, and the median income for a family was $50,134. Males had a median income of $36,250 versus $27,273 for females. The per capita income for the town was $22,908. About 8.8% of families and 15.6% of the population were below the poverty line, including 21.4% of those under age 18 and 3.4% of those age 65 or over.

== Communities and locations in Highland ==
- Barryville – A hamlet in the southern part of the town, located on Route 55 by the Delaware River.
- Eldred – A hamlet in the central part of the town, located along Route 55, and the location of the Highland Town Hall.
- Highland Lake – A hamlet east of Eldred, located by the lake, "Highland Lake."
- Lake DeVenoge – A private community east of Highland Lake.
- Minisink Ford – A hamlet in the southwestern part of the town by the Delaware River.
- Yulan – A hamlet in the western part of the town on Routes 21 and 23.

== Notable people ==
Notable current and former residents include:

- Albert Hammond Jr., musician and guitarist of The Strokes; lived in Eldred in the 2010s.
