= Tusten, New York =

- Town
- Location of Tusten in Sullivan County, New York
- Coordinates: 41°35′19″N 74°59′38″W
- Country: United States
- State: New York
- County: Sullivan

Area
  - Total: 48.78 sq mi (126.35 km^{2})
  - Land: 47.20 sq mi (122.26 km^{2})
  - Water: 1.58 sq mi (4.09 km^{2})
- Elevation: 1,120 ft (340 m)

Population (2020)
  - Total: 1,405
- Time zone: UTC-5 (Eastern (EST))
  - Summer (DST): UTC-4 (EDT)
- FIPS code: 36-75759
- GNIS feature ID: 0979565
- Website: https://www.townoftusten.gov/

Tusten is a town is located in the southwestern part of Sullivan County in the U.S. state of New York. The population was 1,405 at the 2020 census. The name is derived from Dr. Benjamin Tusten, a distinguished military leader killed when he refused to leave his troops at the Battle of Minisink.

== History ==
The town was previously part of the Towns of Mamakating and Lumberland in 1853. Benjamin Homans was the first settler, setting himself up by Narrowsburg. The Ten Mile River Baptist Church and Tusten Stone Arch Bridge are listed on the National Register of Historic Places.

Tusten is also home to the historic Fort Delaware. Markers celebrating local history can be found on walker friendly paths around town.

== Geography ==
The western town line, delineated by the Delaware River, is the border of Pennsylvania.

According to the United States Census Bureau, the town has a total area of 48.8 square miles (126 km^{2}), of which 47.3 square miles (123 km^{2}) is land and 1.5 square miles (3.9 km^{2}) (3.18%) is water.

== Demographics ==
Historical population
Census	Pop.	Note	%±
1860	871		—
1870	1,028		18.0%
1880	1,050		2.1%
1890	1,004		−4.4%
1900	890		−11.4%
1910	878		−1.3%
1920	881		0.3%
1930	914		3.7%
1940	950		3.9%
1950	1,042		9.7%
1960	1,087		4.3%
1970	1,224		12.6%
1980	1,424		16.3%
1990	1,271		−10.7%
2000	1,415		11.3%
2010	1,515		7.1%
2020	1,405		−7.3%
U.S. Decennial Census

As of the census of 2000, there were 1,415 people, 583 households, and 367 families residing in the town. The population density was 29.9 inhabitants per square mile (11.5/km^{2}). There were 1,008 housing units at an average density of 21.3 per square mile (8.2/km^{2}). The racial makeup of the town was 89.12% White, 6.93% African American, 0.14% Native American, 0.92% Asian, 1.13% from other races, and 1.77% from two or more races. Hispanic or Latino of any race were 3.60% of the population.

There were 583 households, out of which 26.2% had children under the age of 18 living with them, 49.6% were married couples living together, 8.6% had a female householder with no husband present, and 37.0% were non-families. 32.4% of all households were made up of individuals, and 17.8% had someone living alone who was 65 years of age or older. The average household size was 2.30 and the average family size was 2.89.

In the town, the population was spread out, with 22.3% under the age of 18, 4.2% from 18 to 24, 24.1% from 25 to 44, 28.3% from 45 to 64, and 21.0% who were 65 years of age or older. The median age was 44 years. For every 100 females, there were 103.9 males. For every 100 females age 18 and over, there were 105.8 males.

The median income for a household in the town was $38,824, and the median income for a family was $46,250. Males had a median income of $35,125 versus $25,938 for females. The per capita income for the town was $19,413. About 6.8% of families and 9.2% of the population were below the poverty line, including 8.9% of those under age 18 and 4.3% of those age 65 or over.

== Government ==
Local Government

The town of Tusten is governed under the New York state form of town government. The governing body is five members (one supervisor, four council members) whose members are elected directly by the voters at-large in general elections to serve four-year terms of office on a staggered basis, except the supervisor, whose term is two years.

As of 2024, members of the Tusten town board are Supervisor Bernard R. Johnson (R, term as supervisor ends December 31, 2025), Councilwoman Cass Collins (D, term on board ends December 31, 2027) Councilman Bruce Gettel (D, term on board ends December 31, 2027), Councilman Kevin McDonough (D, term on board ends December 31, 2025), and Councilman Greg Triggs (D, term on board ends December 31, 2025).

Crystal Weston (R, term ending December 31, 2025) is Town Clerk.

Jane Luchsinger (D) is town Deputy Supervisor.

Monthly town board meetings are held the second Tuesday of each month beginning at 6:30pm ET at the Tusten Town Hall at 210 Bridge Street in Narrowsburg, New York.

== Communities and locations in Tusten ==
- Narrowsburg – A hamlet by the Delaware River. It was formerly called Homans Eddy
- Beaver Brook Corners (or Beaver Brook) – A hamlet in the eastern part of the town
- Feagles Lake – A small lake east of Narrowsburg
- Hunts Corners – A hamlet east of Narrowsburg on Route 52
- Lava – A hamlet east of Narrowsburg on Route 52
- Neweiden – A hamlet southeast of Narrowsburg on the Ten Mile River, formerly called Swamp Mills
- Smith Switch – A location in the northwestern corner of the town by the Delaware River and on Route 97
- Ten Mile River – A small river and the site of a large summer camp maintained by the Boy Scouts of America, located near Neweiden
- Tusten – The hamlet of Tusten is located in the southwestern part of the town on Route 97

== Notable people ==
- Benjamin Woodward, politician
- Gustavus Adolphus Neumann, newspaper editor
