= Lumberland, New York =

- Town
- Location of Lumberland in Sullivan County, New York
- Coordinates: 41°29′10″N 74°48′48″W
- Country: United States
- State: New York
- County: Sullivan

Area
  - Total: 49.34 sq mi (127.80 km^{2})
  - Land: 46.54 sq mi (120.54 km^{2})
  - Water: 2.81 sq mi (7.27 km^{2})
- Elevation: 1,342 ft (409 m)

Population (2020)
  - Total: 2,243
  - Density: 48.19/sq mi (18.61/km^{2})
- Time zone: UTC-5 (Eastern (EST))
  - Summer (DST): UTC-4 (EDT)
- FIPS code: 36-43786
- GNIS feature ID: 0979172
- Website: Town website

Lumberland is a town in Sullivan County, New York, United States. The population was 2,243 at the 2020 census. The town is a rural community in the southwestern part of the county.

== History ==
The town was formed in 1798 from the town of Mamakating, but was subsequently reduced to form other towns in 1807 and 1809. The town was partitioned in 1853 into three parts: Lumberland, Highland, and Tusten.

Lumberland in its current form began to blossom when the Delaware and Hudson Canal opened in 1828. The canal helped transport anthracite coal from the mines of northeastern Pennsylvania to the burgeoning markets of major cities. Settlements that popped up along the canal included Pond Eddy, Knights Eddy, Handsome Eddy, and Mongaup. When the canal was phased out due to the advent of railroads on the Pennsylvania side of the Delaware, its bed was converted into New York State Route 97 in the 1930s.

The Pond Eddy Bridge was listed on the National Register of Historic Places in 1988.

== Geography ==
The southwestern town line, delineated by the Delaware River, is the border of Pennsylvania. The eastern town line is the border of Orange County. The north is bordered by the town of Forestburgh, and the west by the town of Highland.

The area has maintained its rural characteristics, being largely residential, with minimal commerce. There is one gas station in Glen Spey, and there are no traffic lights in Lumberland.

Lumberland is located within the Upper Delaware Scenic and Recreational River. Elevations range from approximately 600 feet near the Delaware River to over 1,300 feet above sea level on the bluffs overlooking the Delaware, and where the Catskill Mountains begin to rise in the northern reaches of the town. The terrain is largely mountainous and wooded, with the majority of residents settling close to or on main roads, such as New York State Route 97 (Upper Delaware Scenic Byway).

Rivers and streams abound in Lumberland. The Delaware River is widely accessible through rafting companies that do day trips and that have campsites dotted along the river. The Mill Brook runs north-south from the Black Forest Colony, through Pond Eddy hollow, to the Delaware at the Mill Brook Inn. Fish Cabin Brook takes a similar course just to the east. The Mongaup River runs from Rio Reservoir southward into the Delaware at the Orange County line.

According to the United States Census Bureau, the town has a total area of 49.6 square miles (128 km^{2}), of which 47.0 square miles (122 km^{2}) is land and 2.6 square miles (6.7 km^{2}) (5.30%) is water.

== Demographics ==
Historical population
Census	Pop.	Note	%±
1820	569		—
1830	955		67.8%
1840	1,205		26.2%
1850	2,635		118.7%
1860	970		−63.2%
1870	1,065		9.8%
1880	1,050		−1.4%
1890	875		−16.7%
1900	809		−7.5%
1910	716		−11.5%
1920	480		−33.0%
1930	499		4.0%
1940	490		−1.8%
1950	494		0.8%
1960	538		8.9%
1970	857		59.3%
1980	1,210		41.2%
1990	1,425		17.8%
2000	1,936		35.9%
2010	2,468		27.5%
2020	2,243		−9.1%
U.S. Decennial Census

As of the census of 2000, there were 1,939 people, 781 households, and 538 families residing in the town. The population density was 41.2 inhabitants per square mile (15.9/km^{2}). There were 1,419 housing units at an average density of 30.2 per square mile (11.7/km^{2}). The racial makeup of the town was 96.75% White, 0.21% African American, 0.10% Native American, 0.83% Asian, 0.15% Pacific Islander, 0.77% from other races, and 1.19% from two or more races. Hispanic or Latino of any race were 1.91% of the population.

There were 781 households, out of which 32.5% had children under the age of 18 living with them, 58.6% were married couples living together, 7.6% had a female householder with no husband present, and 31.1% were non-families. 27.4% of all households were made up of individuals, and 13.3% had someone living alone who was 65 years of age or older. The average household size was 2.48 and the average family size was 3.02.

In the town, the population was spread out, with 25.6% under the age of 18, 4.4% from 18 to 24, 28.0% from 25 to 44, 24.3% from 45 to 64, and 17.7% who were 65 years of age or older. The median age was 41 years. For every 100 females, there were 93.1 males. For every 100 females age 18 and over, there were 95.1 males.

The median income for a household in the town was $42,625, and the median income for a family was $45,100. Males had a median income of $38,080 versus $27,222 for females. The per capita income for the town was $19,665. About 8.7% of families and 11.7% of the population were below the poverty line, including 15.0% of those under age 18 and 9.9% of those age 65 or over.

== Communities and locations in Lumberland ==
- Black Forest – A private community in Glen Spey off Hollow Road, north of Pond Eddy.
- Glen Spey – A hamlet near the center of the town.
- Handsome Eddy – A hamlet on the western town line, on north bank of the Delaware River.
- Knights Eddy – A hamlet on the Delaware River on the southern town line, east of Pond Eddy.
- Mohican Lake – A lake in the northwestern part of the town.
- Mongaup – A hamlet in the southeastern part of the town by the Delaware and Mongaup Rivers.
- Pond Eddy – A hamlet on the north bank of the Delaware River. The Pond Eddy Bridge is located here.
- Rio Reservoir – A reservoir at the eastern town line.
- Upper Mongaup – A hamlet by the eastern town line.

== Camp ==
Camp Ramah in Glen Spey was located in Lumberland, 2 miles (3.2 km) from the Delaware River. It opened in 1967 and closed in 1971. On June 16, 1976, a fire broke out in the kitchen-dining hall and destroyed many buildings. Lumberland firefighters burned the rest of the camp down in 1982 as a training exercise, and to ensure the safety and integrity of the townspeople around them.

Camps currently exist as rafting companies along the Delaware River in Knights Eddy and Pond Eddy. There is also Camp Simcha, which is designated for children with disabilities.

== Popular culture ==
Lumberland is the focal point of product testing for the Best Made Company.

It was also the subject of the song "The Darlings of Lumberland" on the 2013 album Nanobots by the alternative rock group They Might Be Giants.
