= Lackawaxen, Pennsylvania =

Unincorporated community in Pennsylvania, US

- Unincorporated community
- Location within Pennsylvania
- Coordinates: 41°28′55″N 74°59′10″W
- Country: United States
- State: Pennsylvania
- County: Pike
- Elevation: 633 ft (193 m)
- Time zone: UTC-5 (Eastern (EST))
  - Summer (DST): UTC-4 (EDT)
- ZIP code: 18435
- Area code: 570
- GNIS feature ID: 1198986

Lackawaxen is an unincorporated community in Lackawaxen Township, Pike County, Pennsylvania, United States. The community is located at the confluence of the Delaware and Lackawaxen Rivers, the former of which forms the state line with New York. Lackawaxen has a post office with ZIP code 18435.

== Notable person ==
- Ed Porray, former baseball pitcher who is the only MLB player to have been born at sea
- Pearl Zane Grey, Pearl Zane Grey (January 31, 1872 – October 23, 1939) was an American author and dentist.
