= New York–Pennsylvania Joint Interstate Bridge Commission =

American interstate bridge authority

Interstate agency overview
- Formed: May 1919; 106 years ago
- Jurisdiction: New York and Pennsylvania

The New York–Pennsylvania Joint Interstate Bridge Commission, or simply the Joint Interstate Bridge Commission, is an interstate agency jointly owned by the states of New York and Pennsylvania. The commission was formed in 1919 by the two states to manage the crossings of the Delaware River that connected them. It currently maintains and operates nine toll-free bridges from the New Jersey–Pennsylvania state line to the end of Pennsylvania and New York's shared border along the Delaware River.

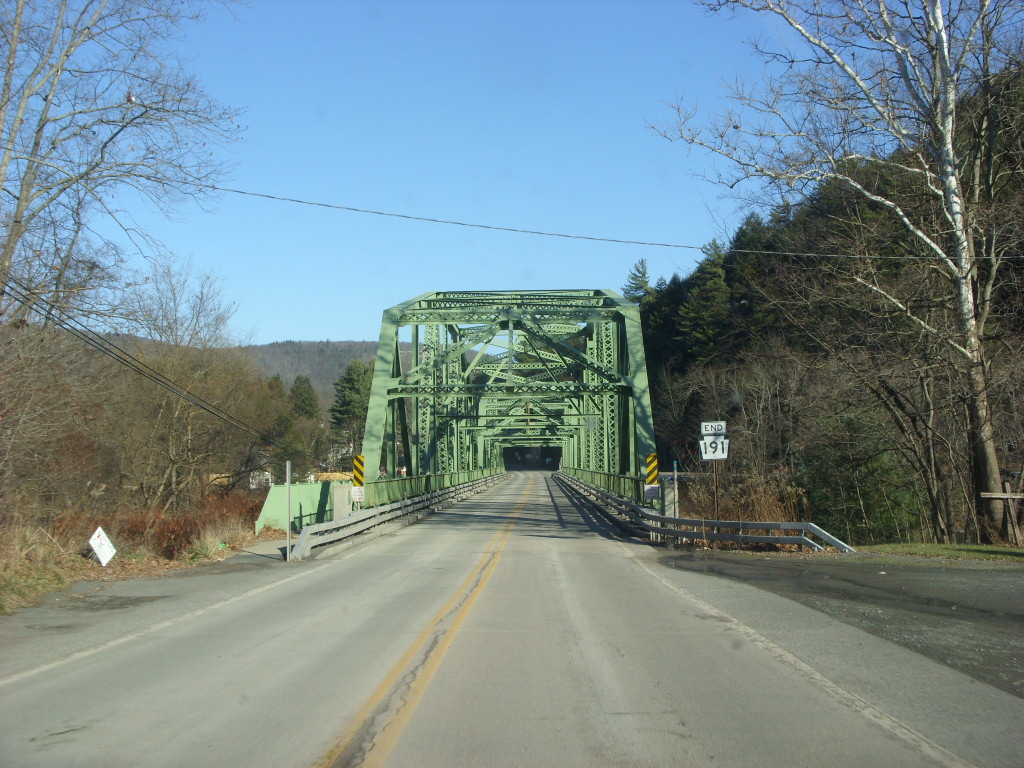
Lake Como–Hancock Bridge

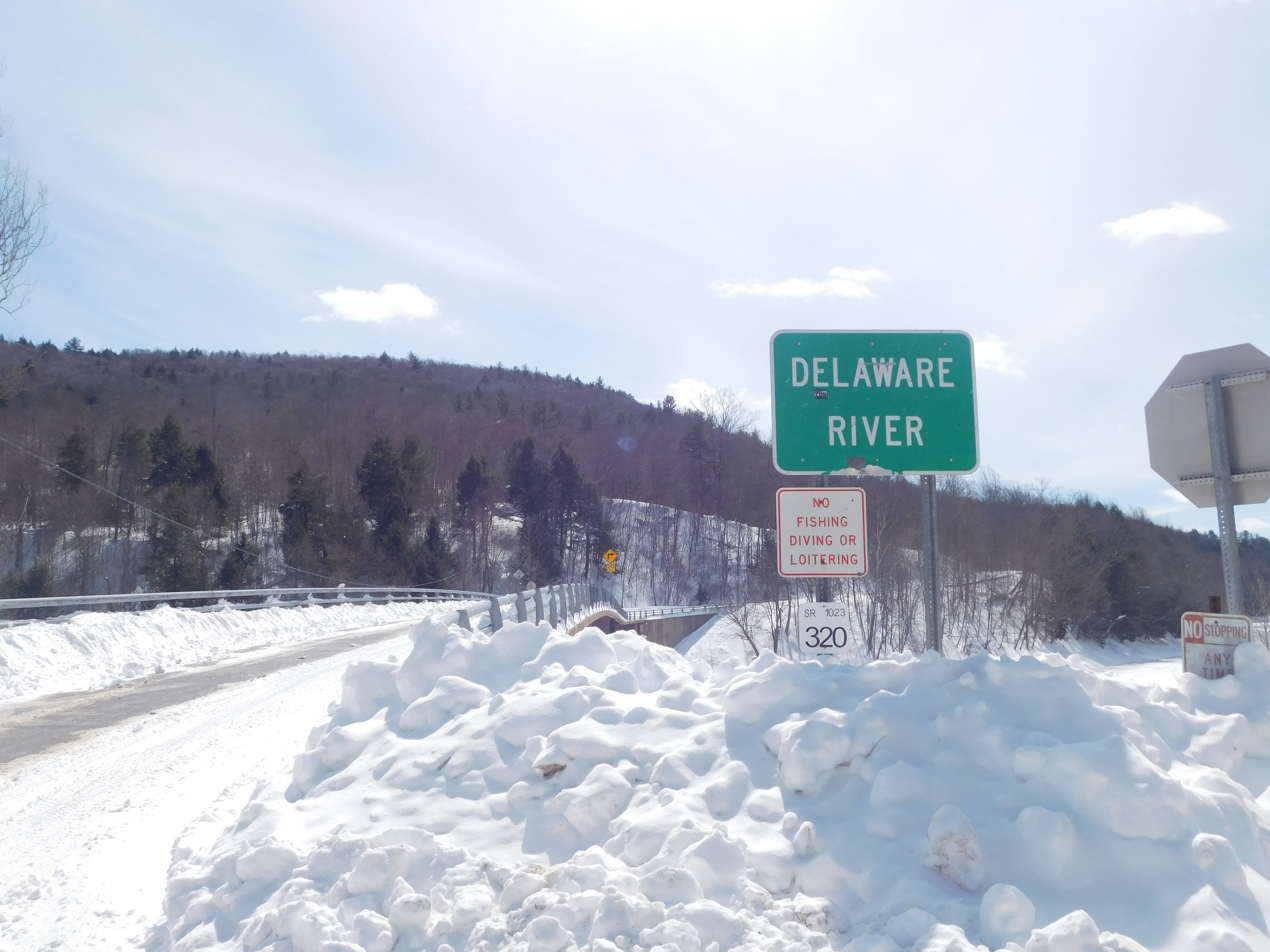
The Lordville–Equinunk Bridge

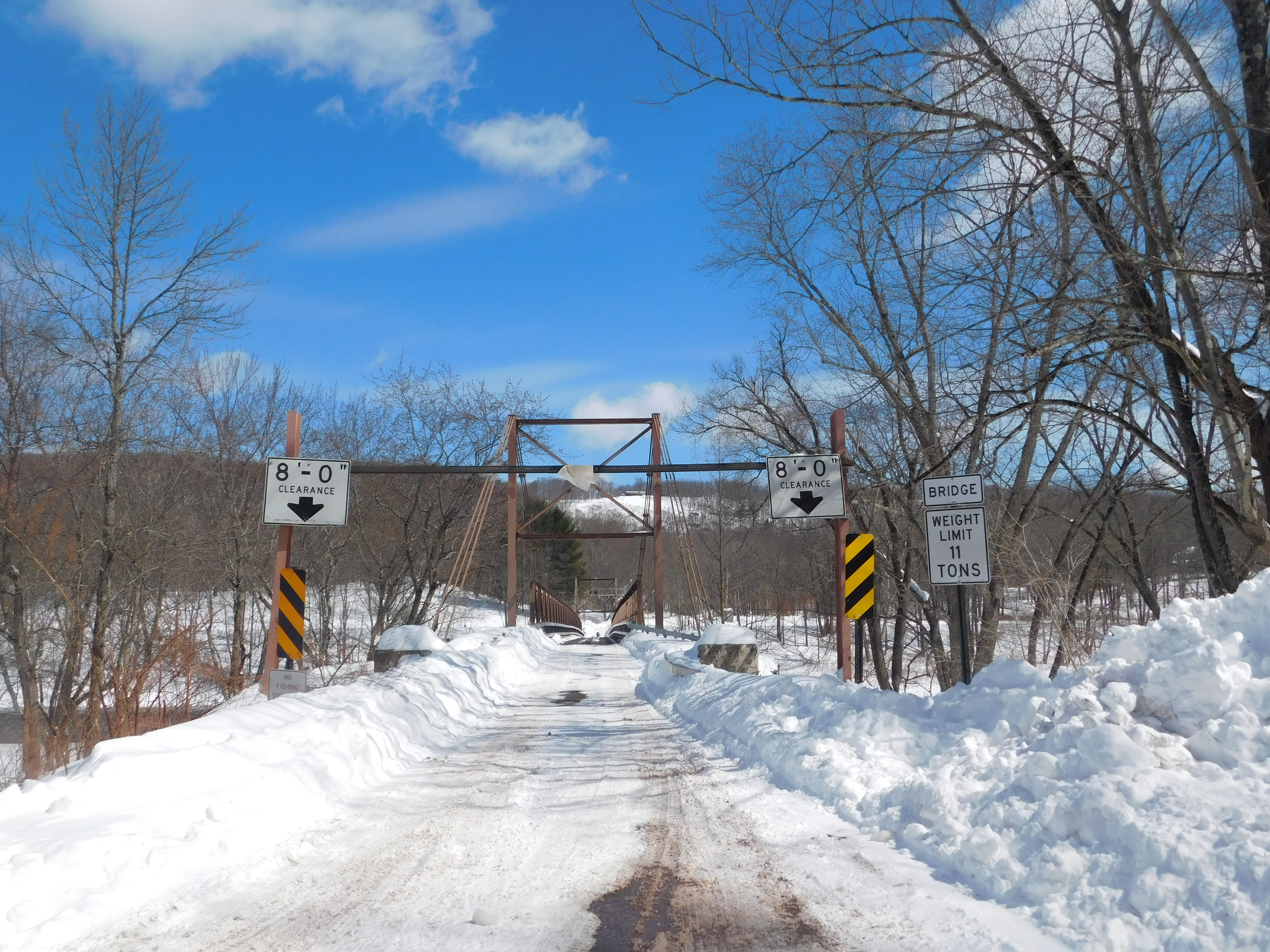
Kellams Bridge

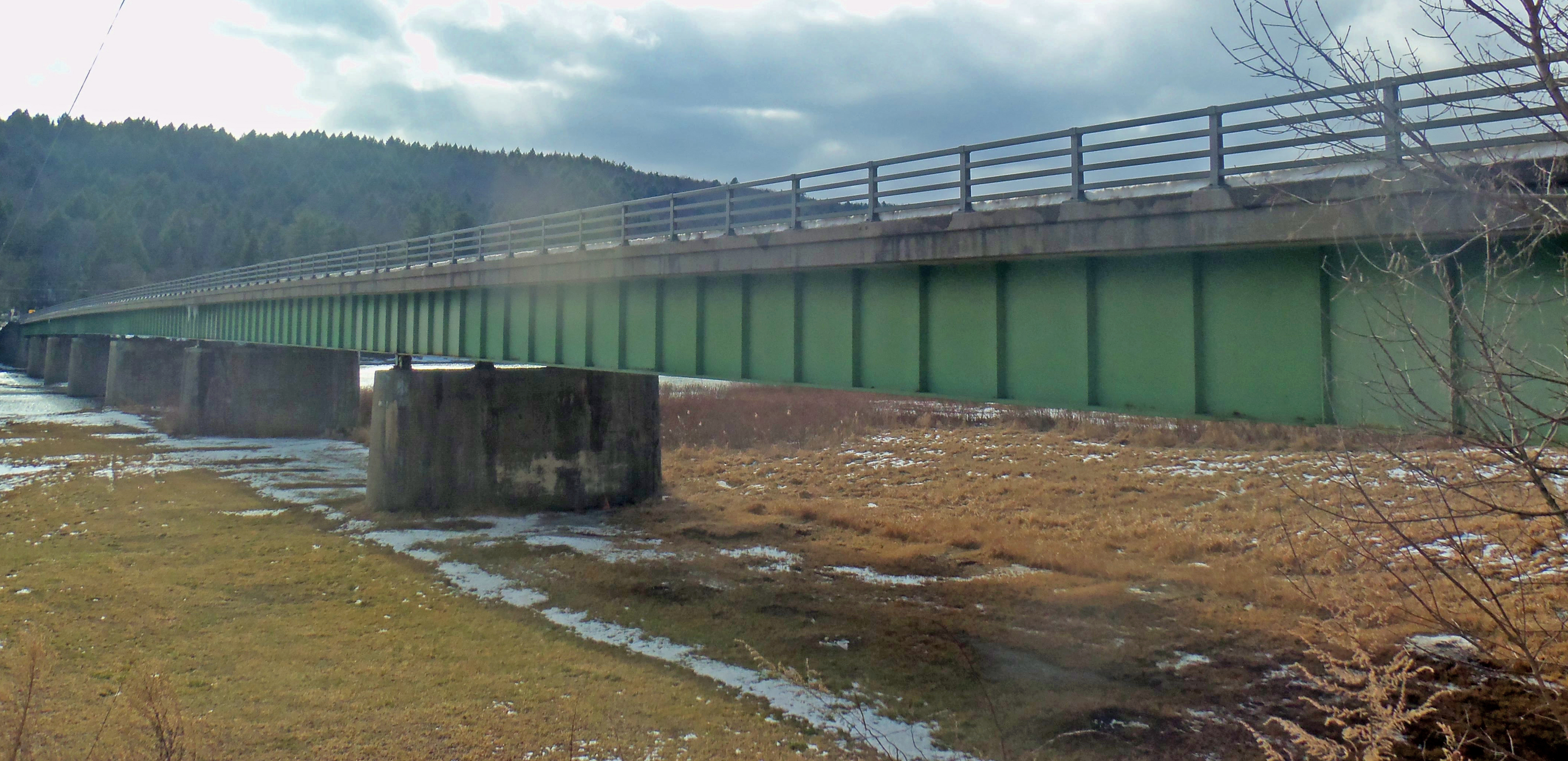
Callicoon Bridge

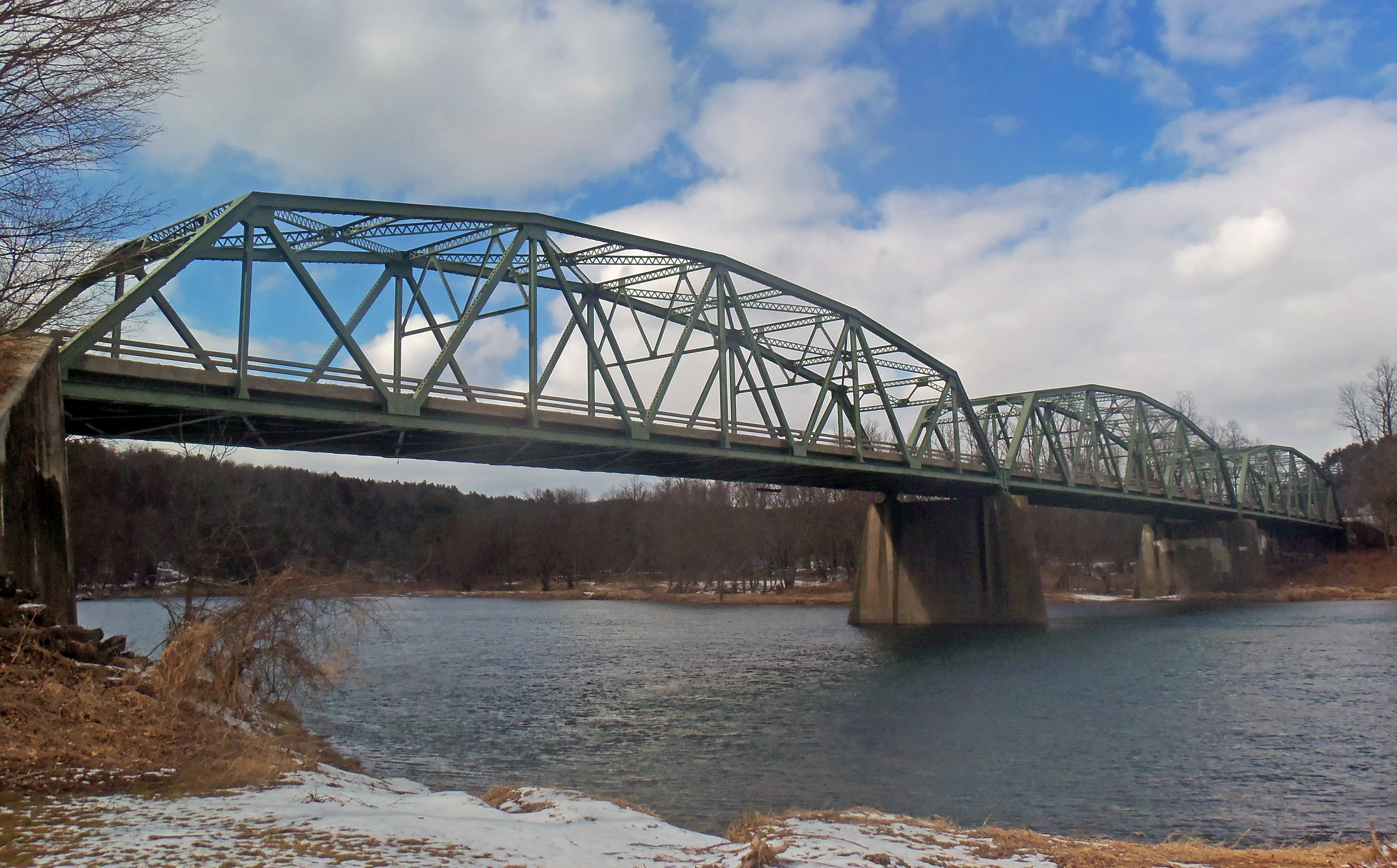
Cochecton–Damascus Bridge

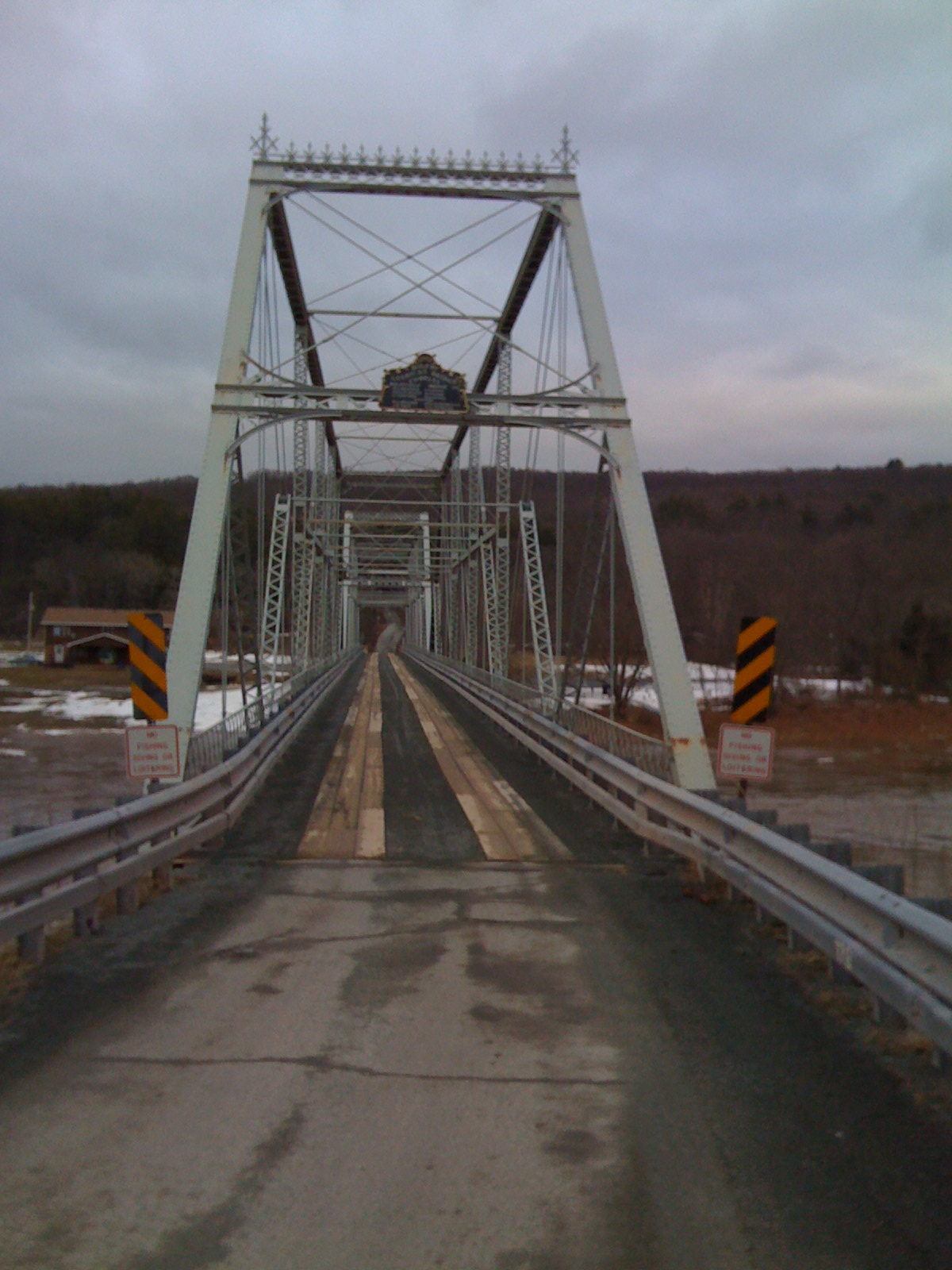
Skinners Falls–Milanville Bridge

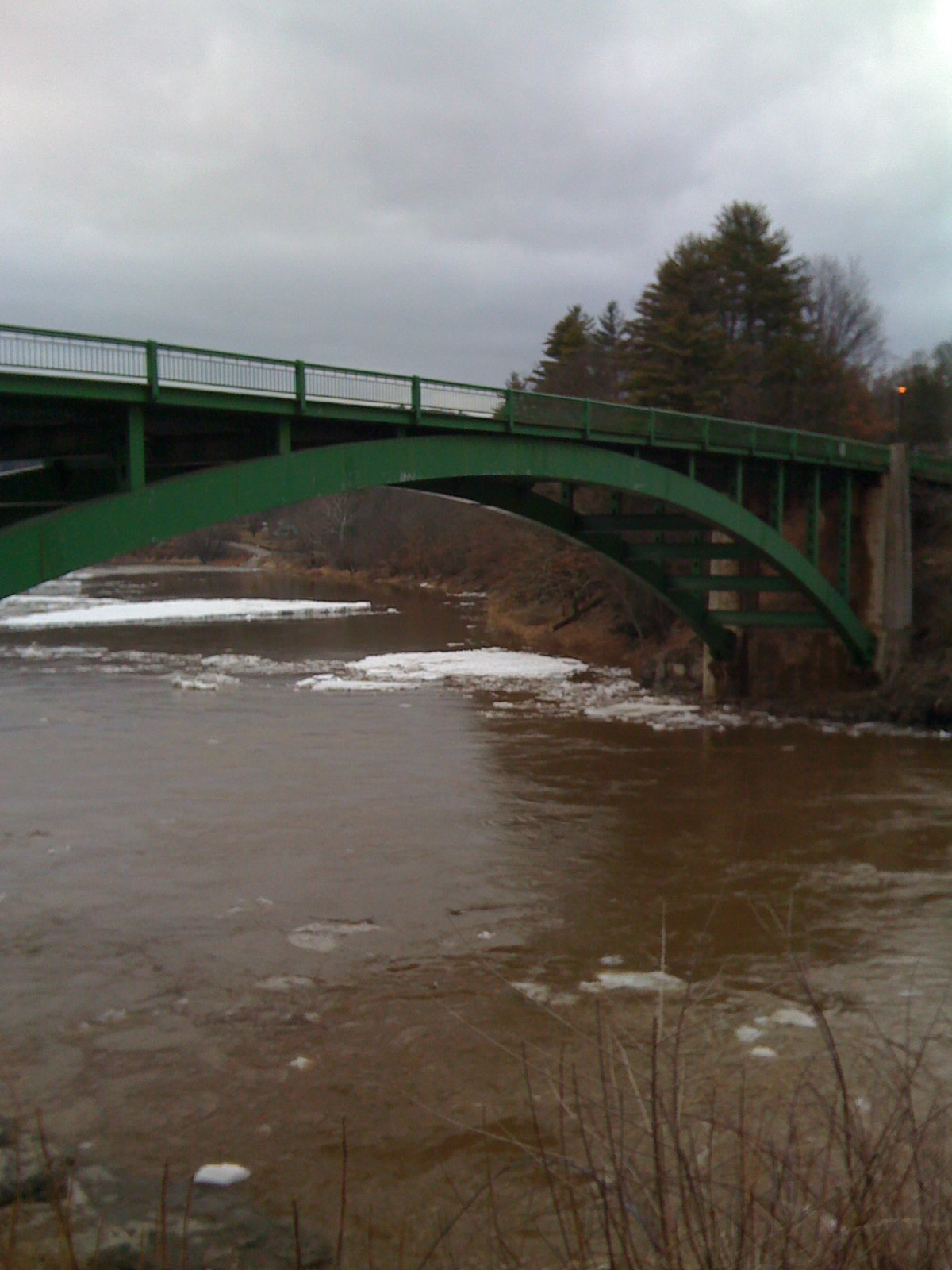
Narrowsburg–Darbytown Bridge

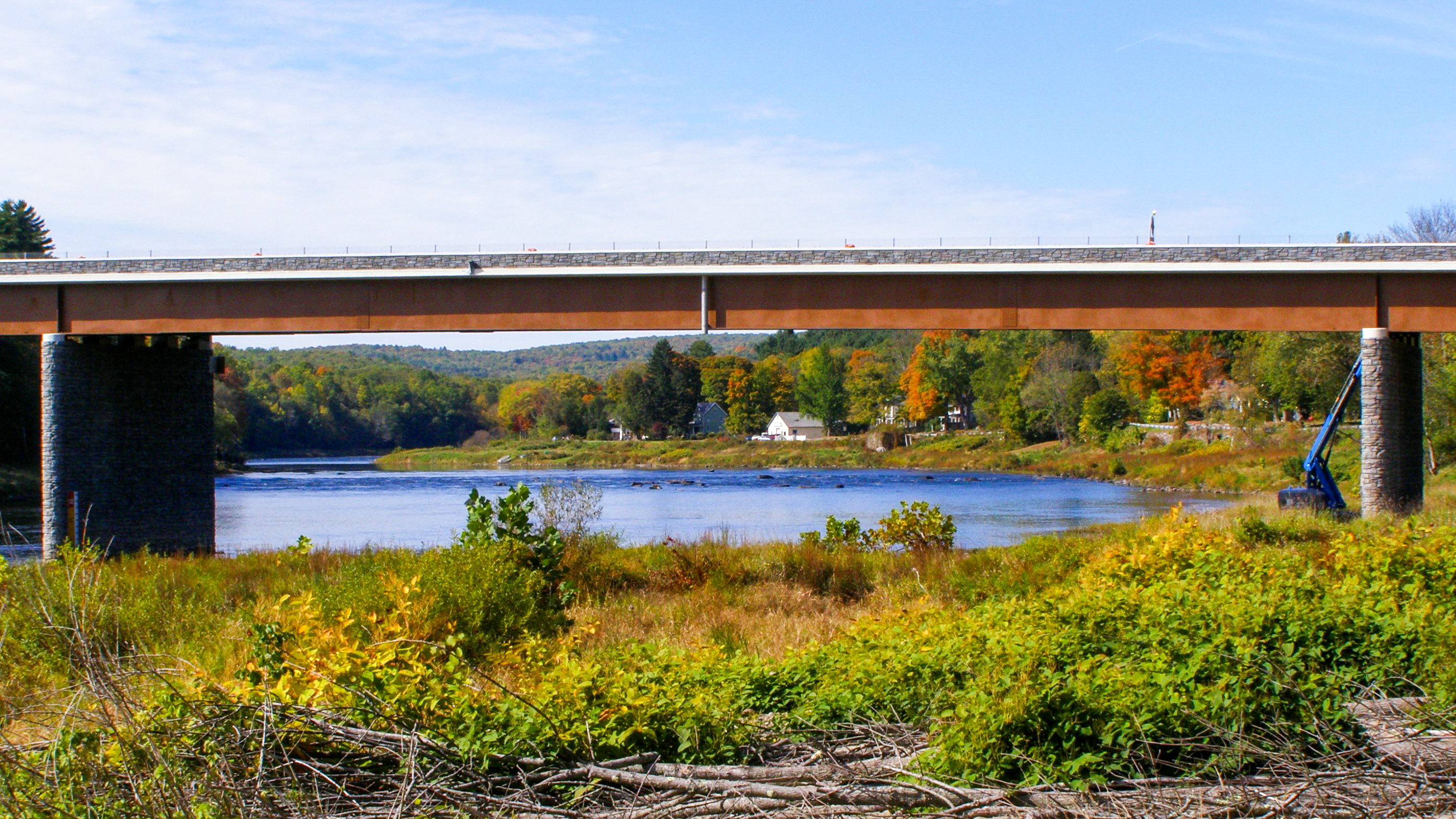
Barryville–Shohola Bridge

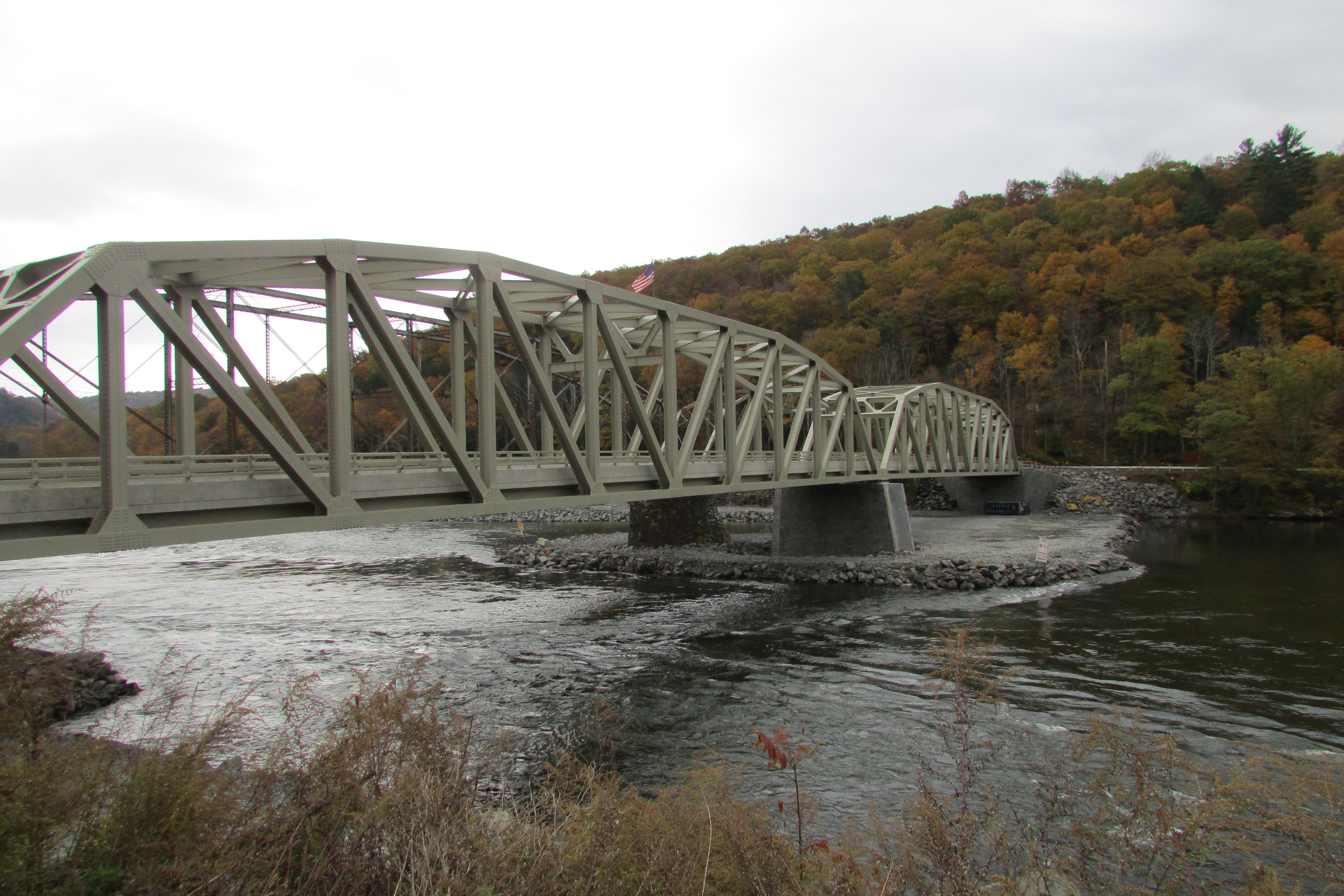
Pond Eddy Bridge

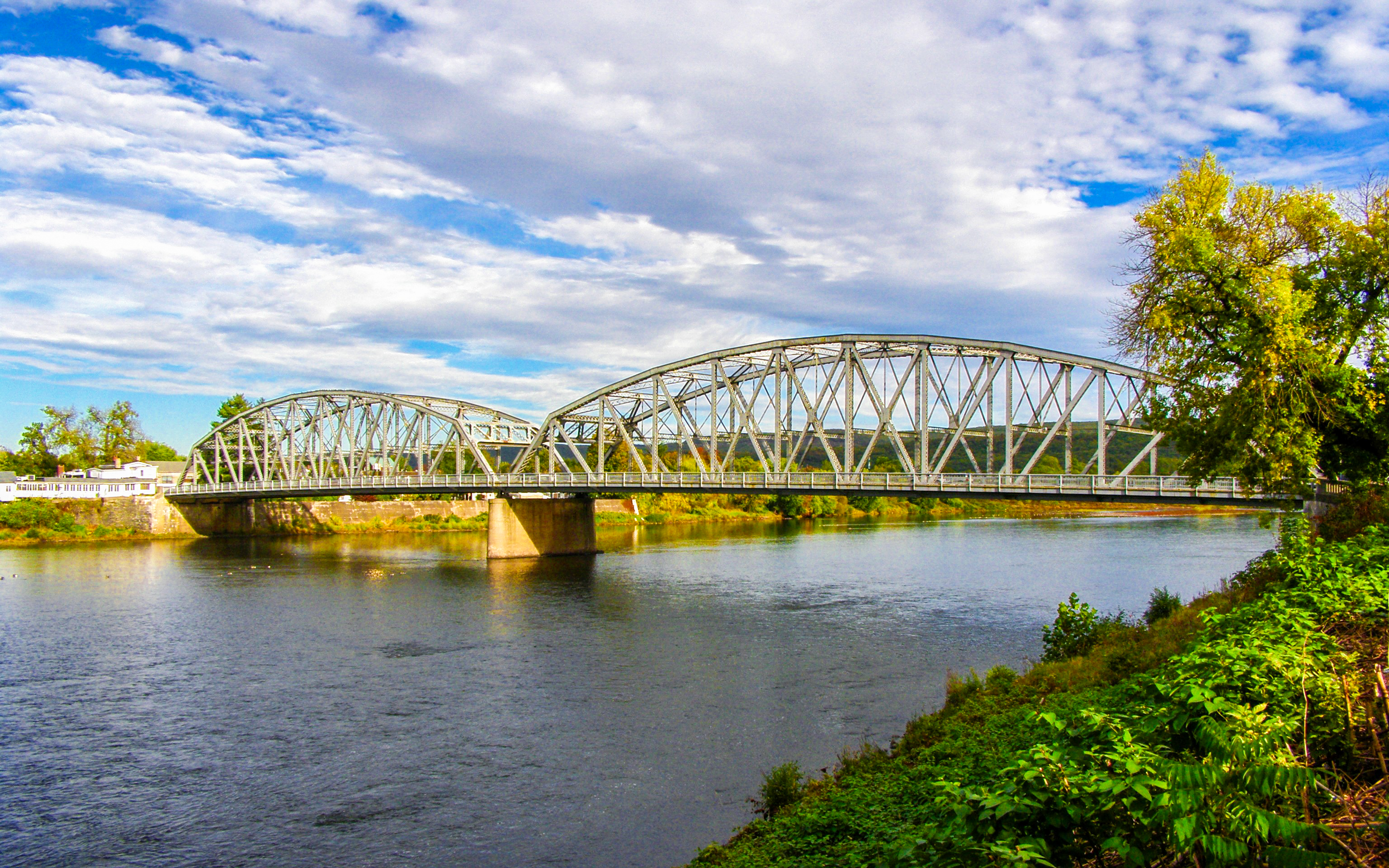
Mid-Delaware Bridge

== History ==
In 1919, state officials proposed a commission to manage bridges between New York and Pennsylvania. The New York Commission called a meeting in May 1919 to establish the New York–Pennsylvania Joint Interstate Bridge Commission. Promptly, the existing bridges spanning the Delaware River were examined to assess their value and facilitate their purchase. Within the next five years, almost all of the existing bridges spanning the Delaware River between New York and Pennsylvania would be owned and operated by the newly founded commission.

== Bridges ==
From north to south:

- Lake Como-Hancock Bridge
  The Lake Como–Hancock Bridge, commonly referred to as the Hancock Bridge is a series of two bridges crossing the east and west branches of the Delaware River after the river splits at Hancock, New York
- Lordville–Equinunk Bridge
  The Lordville–Equinunk Bridge is a girder bridge that connects Lordville, New York with Equinunk, Pennsylvania, United States over the Delaware River.
- Kellams Bridge
  The Kellams Bridge, also known as the Little Equinunk Bridge and Kellams–Stalker Bridge, is an underspanned suspension bridge spanning the Delaware River between Stalker, Pennsylvania, and Hankins, New York.
- Callicoon Bridge
  The Callicoon Bridge carries vehicles and pedestrians across the Delaware River between the unincorporated hamlet of Callicoon in the town of Delaware, part of Sullivan County, New York, and Damascus Township in Wayne County, Pennsylvania, both in the United States. It is a multi-girder structure of steel and concrete.
- Cochecton–Damascus Bridge
  The Cochecton–Damascus Bridge, sometimes called the Cochecton Dam Road Bridge, crosses the Delaware River in the United States between the unincorporated hamlet of Cochecton, in Sullivan County, New York, and Damascus Township, in Wayne County, Pennsylvania. On the Pennsylvania side, it is the eastern terminus of State Route 371; in New York, its approach road is County Route 114.
- Skinners Falls–Milanville Bridge
  The Skinners Falls–Milanville Bridge was a bridge spanning the Delaware River between Milanville, Pennsylvania, and Skinners Falls, New York, in Wayne County, Pennsylvania, and Sullivan County, New York. The bridge was 470 feet (140 m) long and held one single lane of Skinners Falls Road.
- Narrowsburg–Darbytown Bridge
  The Narrowsburg–Darbytown Bridge is an arch under bridge spanning the Delaware River between Darbytown, Pennsylvania, and Narrowsburg, New York. It carries Pennsylvania Route 652 and New York State Route 52.
- Barryville–Shohola Bridge
  The Barryville–Shohola Bridge is the fifth generation of bridges constructed over the Delaware River at the communities of Shohola Township, Pennsylvania, and Barryville, New York. The bridge serves both communities, with two major state legislative highways, Pennsylvania Traffic Route 434 and New York State Touring Route 55 (along with the co-designation of Sullivan County Route 11).
- Pond Eddy Bridge
  The Pond Eddy Bridge is a petit truss bridge spanning the Delaware River between the hamlet of Pond Eddy in Lumberland, New York, and the settlement informally called Pond Eddy in Shohola Township, Pennsylvania. It is accessible from NY 97 in Lumberland on the New York side and two dead-end local roads, Flagstone Road (State Route 1011) and Rosa Road, on the Pennsylvania side.
- Mid-Delaware Bridge
  The Mid-Delaware Bridge, sometimes known as the Port Jervis–Matamoras Bridge or the Fourth Barrett Bridge, is a continuous truss bridge which carries U.S. Route 6 (US 6) and US 209 across that river between those two communities and thus the states of New York and Pennsylvania. It is the only four-lane bridge on the upper main stem of the Delaware.

== See also ==
- List of crossings of the Delaware River
