= Cochecton–Damascus Bridge =

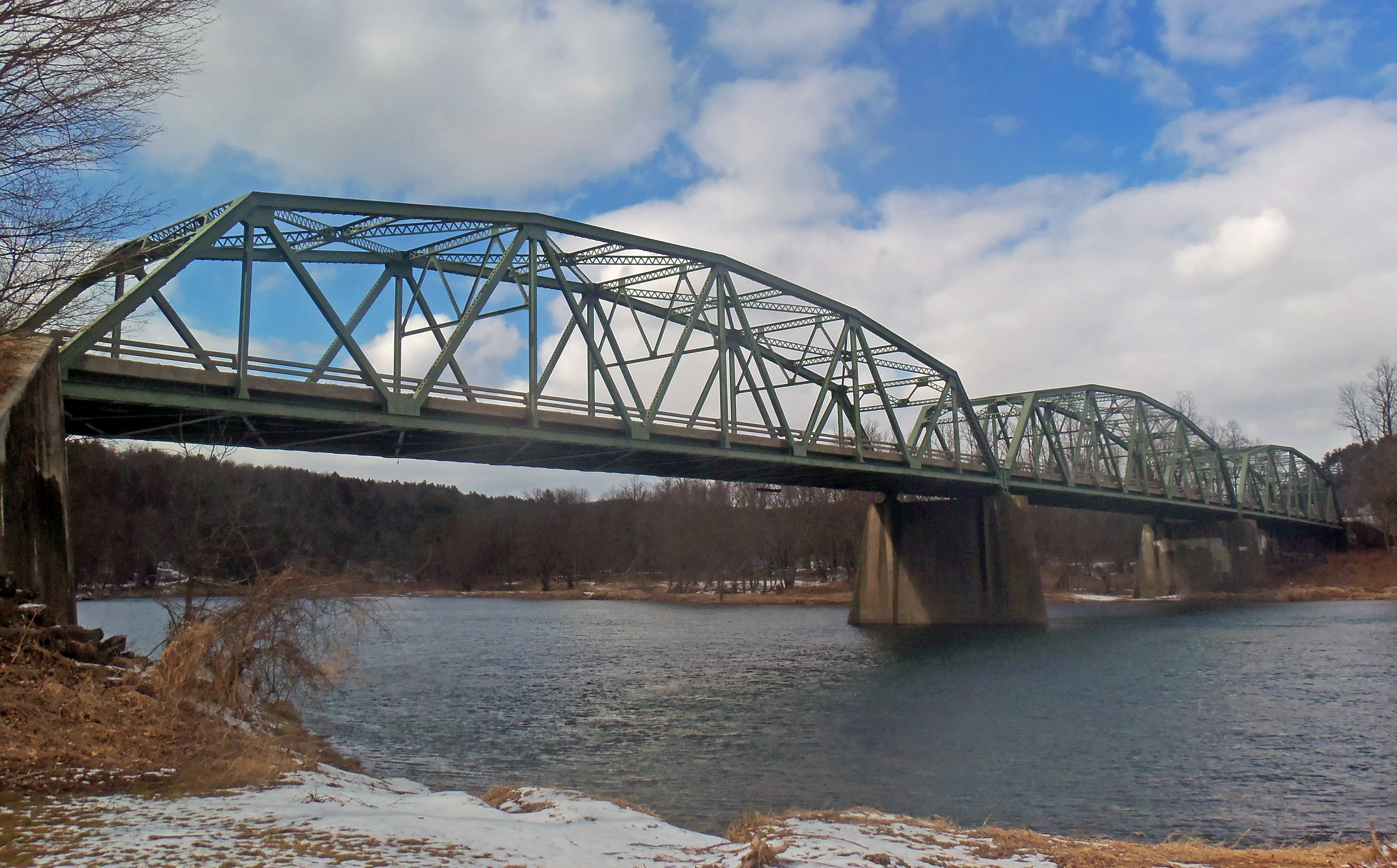
- View from Pennsylvania side, 2013
- Coordinates: 41.70501°N 75.06671°W
- Carries: Pennsylvania Route 371, Sullivan County Route 114
- Crosses: Delaware River
- Locale: Cochecton, NY; Damascus Township, PA
- Other name: Cochecton Dam Road Bridge
- Owner: New York–Pennsylvania Joint Interstate Bridge Commission
- Maintained by: New York–Pennsylvania Joint Interstate Bridge Commission
- National Bridge Inventory: 1091660

Characteristics
- Design: Warren through truss
- Material: Steel, concrete
- Total length: 684 feet (208 m)
- Width: 26 feet (7.9 m)
- Longest span: 224.7 feet (68.5 m)
- No. of spans: 3
- Clearance above: 14.8 feet (4.5 m)

History
- Constructed by: Triple Cities Construction
- Opened: 1950

Statistics
- Daily traffic: 1419

Location
- Interactive map of Cochecton–Damascus Bridge

The Cochecton–Damascus Bridge, sometimes called the Cochecton Dam Road Bridge, crosses the Delaware River in the United States between the unincorporated hamlet of Cochecton, in Sullivan County, New York, and Damascus Township, in Wayne County, Pennsylvania. On the Pennsylvania side it is the eastern terminus of State Route 371; in New York its approach road is County Route 114. It was built in 1950; bridges have crossed the river at that point since 1819.

Those early bridges replaced ferry services that had to replace them when they collapsed or were washed away during floods. By the late 19th century a private company had built a toll bridge at the site which proved stable. It was eventually bought by a joint commission established by both states, which abolished the toll. A lawsuit against New York over the construction of the current bridge ended in a holding that the state itself could be sued over actions of the commission since that body was not sufficiently distinct from the state, and sovereign immunity did not apply.

== Structure and site ==
The bridge crosses the river from New York on its northeast portal to Pennsylvania on its southwest, just downstream from a bend. It is a polygonal Warren through truss steel bridge with alternating vertical members. Three spans, supported by concrete piers and abutments, comprise the bridge. The longest of those spans is 224 feet (68 m); the bridge's total length is 684 feet (208 m). Its deck carries a two-lane asphalt roadway 26 feet (7.9 m) wide; there is 14.8 feet (4.5 m) of clearance underneath the overhead support structures. A pedestrian walkway is located on the upstream side. Local utility lines cross the river 300 feet (100 m) north of the bridge.

At this point in its course, the Delaware divides the Catskill Mountains of New York from the lower Poconos of Pennsylvania. The terrain around the river is characterized by rolling hills, rising almost 400 feet (120 m) above its 750-foot (230 m) elevation. Within this context, the two sides differ radically.

On the New York side is the river's level flood plain, extending back roughly a thousand feet (300 m) from the bank, beyond which the land begins to rise again. Trees line it and there is a small beach just downstream from the bridge. From the tree line are worked fields that end at the railroad tracks currently owned by the Central New York Railroad, with the buildings of the small hamlet of Cochecton clustered around the junction of County Route 114 and Cochecton Road near the tracks opposite the bridge.

Across the river, in Pennsylvania, the mostly wooded hills slope steeply to the river. There is a smaller beach just downstream from the bridge as well, where Beaverdam Creek, a minor tributary of the Delaware that rises in the nearby hills, flows into the river. It is the site of a public boat launch. From the portal, Route 371 passes in the narrow gap between two hills, ascending gently into the small center of Damascus.

=== Approaches ===
The bridges carries slightly more traffic each day than either the Callicoon Bridge upstream or the Skinners Falls–Milanville Bridge downstream from it. Unlike them, it serves a regional artery—Route 371 connects, via its intersections with other Pennsylvania state highways, the Upper Delaware with Great Bend and other communities at the eastern end of the state's Northern Tier. So the approach on the New York side via Cochecton gives traffic from New York State Route 97, which parallels the Upper Delaware, depends on which direction drivers are coming from.

External videos
- Eastern approach to bridge from northbound Route 97
- Western approach

Northbound vehicles are directed off Route 97 a mile (1.6 km) south of the hamlet onto Cochecton Road, which crosses under the railroad tracks and then parallels them past several fields until it ends at County Route 114 in the center of the hamlet. From Route 97 southbound, which is built into the side of the hills, drivers bear west onto 114 roughly 500 feet (150 m) past the junction with eastbound 114, which ends several miles inland at a junction with State Route 17B. From where both approaches join, they follow Route 114 southeast for 500 feet (150 m) to the bridge's east portal. The road to the previous bridge, located a short distance upriver, forks off on the north side midway between Cochecton and the bridge.

In Pennsylvania the only approach is via Route 371. Just past the bridge it intersects River Road, which serves the residences and farms along the river upstream to the Callicoon Bridge. The southern continuation of River Road, designated unsigned State Route 1004, intersects an oblique angle 300 feet (91 m) to the west. It ends at Milanville, site of the next crossing downstream.

== History ==
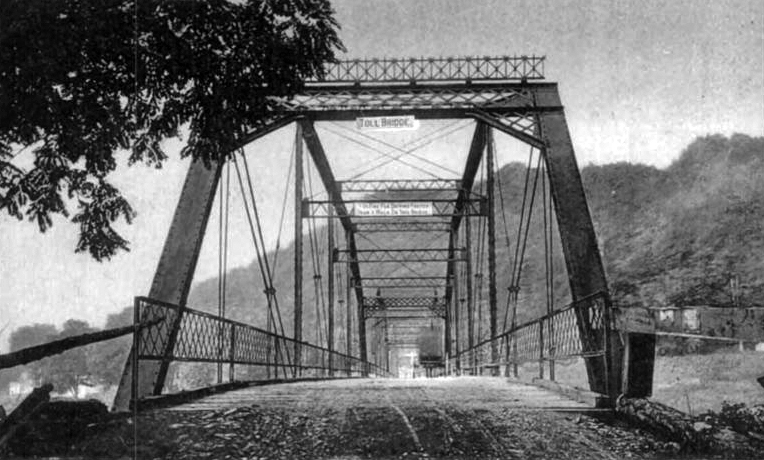
The early 20th-century bridge, seen from Cochecton

In 1801, following the incorporation of the village of Newburgh, the Newburgh and Cochecton Turnpike company was formed to build that road, connecting the Hudson River port city with the Delaware Valley and the forest products harvested there. Settlement of the region, previously limited to only a few communities along the river, grew so quickly that Sullivan County was formed in 1809. By 1810 it was complete, its route following what is today State Route 17K, the county roads that were once State Route 17 before the Quickway expressway was built, and State Route 17B to County Route 114.

On the Pennsylvania side the road continued as the Cochecton and Great Bend Turnpike. Travelers at first crossed the Delaware via ferry services that had existed under royal charters since before the Revolution. In 1817 construction of the first bridge began; the 550-foot (170 m) wooden structure, supported by a single pier midriver, opened two years later. Due to the patriotic atmosphere that prevailed following the recent War of 1812, all members of the military crossing the bridge were exempt from the toll.

The poorly designed bridge soon collapsed into the river. Ferry service resumed until a second bridge was built in 1821 with a sturdier design. It lasted until 1846 when another flood damaged it too severely to use. Ferries again took over until a covered bridge could be designed and built. The turnpikes ceased collecting tolls around 1850; the companies that ran them dissolved themselves after the Civil War, turning the roads over to the towns (in New York) and townships (in Pennsylvania) in which they were located. Cochecton and Damascus continued to thrive, since the bridge was the only one carrying a road over the Delaware for 30 miles (48 km) in either direction until the 1890s, when the Callicoon Bridge was built. The Damascus Historic District and, on the New York side, Parsonage Road in Cochecton, are both listed on the National Register of Historic Places as they contain many extant buildings from this era.

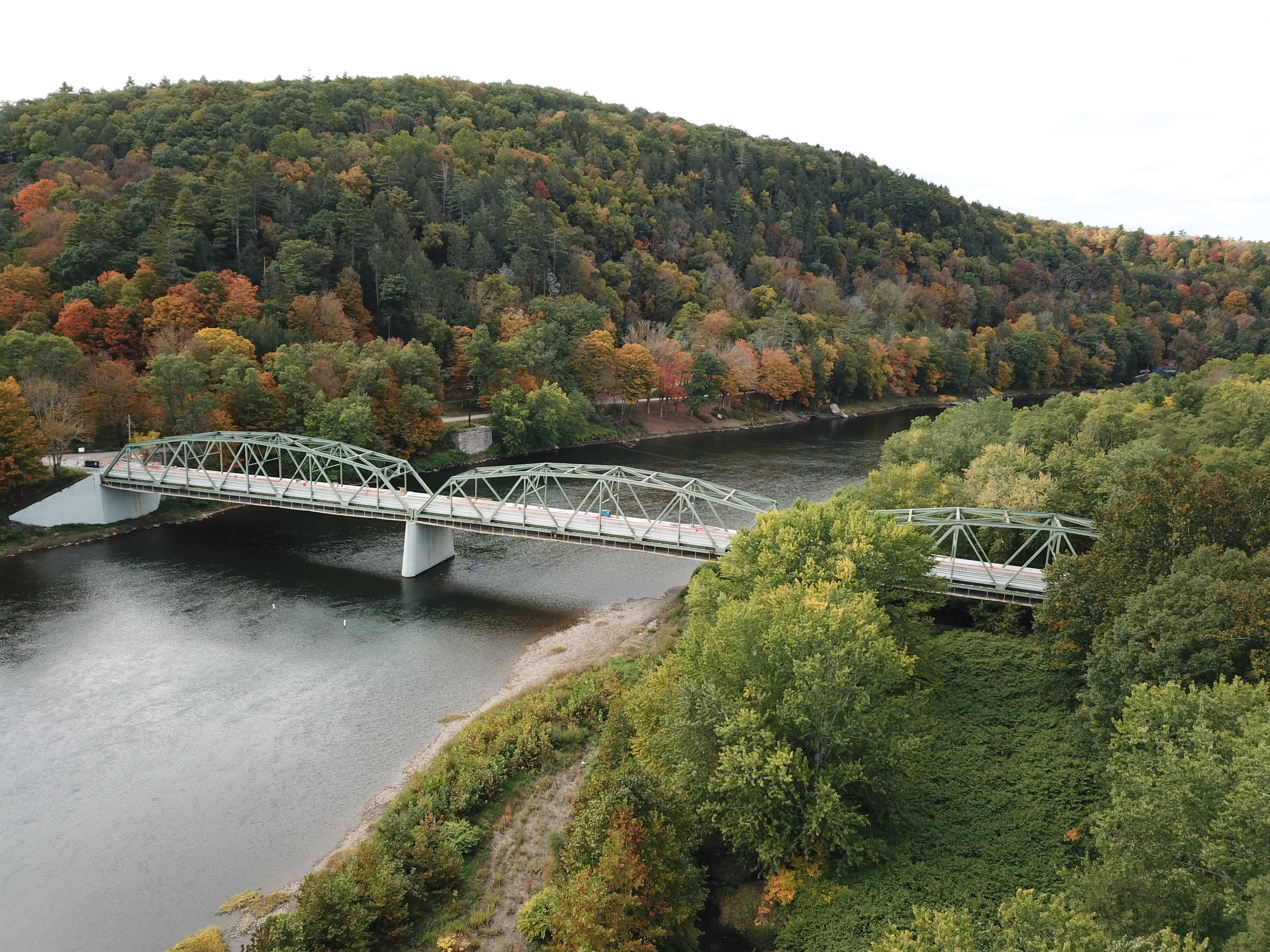
The Cochecton–Damascus Bridge in the last stages of repair in October 2022 as seen from the New York side of the Delaware River.

The mid-19th-century bridge was still in use, the oldest bridge then on the Delaware, when it was washed all the way down to the Narrowsburg–Darbytown Bridge, then the rail bridge at Tusten, in the floods of 1902. Its replacement was a steel bridge that served all the way through the creation of the New York–Pennsylvania Joint Interstate Bridge Commission in the 1910s, which gradually acquired the bridges and made them free at the same time as the route of the old turnpikes was being added to the highway networks of both states. By the middle of the century the bridge was showing the effect of carrying far more automotive traffic between the states than had been thought possible at the time of its construction, and the commission moved to replace it. In 1950 New York's Department of Public Works, acting on the commission's recommendation, awarded the $750,000 contract for a new bridge to Thomas D'Angelo, a Binghamton sole proprietor who did business as Triple Cities Construction. It was built 300 feet (100 m) downriver from its predecessor; one of the original abutments remains on the Pennsylvania side and the residential power line across the river still follows the old bridge's path.

Construction was completed, and the bridge opened, in 1952. Two years later, D'Angelo sued the state over unpaid monies arising from the work. The state moved to have the case dismissed for lack of jurisdiction, arguing that he should have really sued the commission as the party which was ultimately responsible for initiating the work. And he could not sue the commission, the state claimed, since it was covered by the sovereign immunity of not only New York but Pennsylvania, which New York had not waived on its behalf and could not waive on Pennsylvania's behalf. It cited similar holdings in cases brought against the Port Authority of New York and New Jersey.

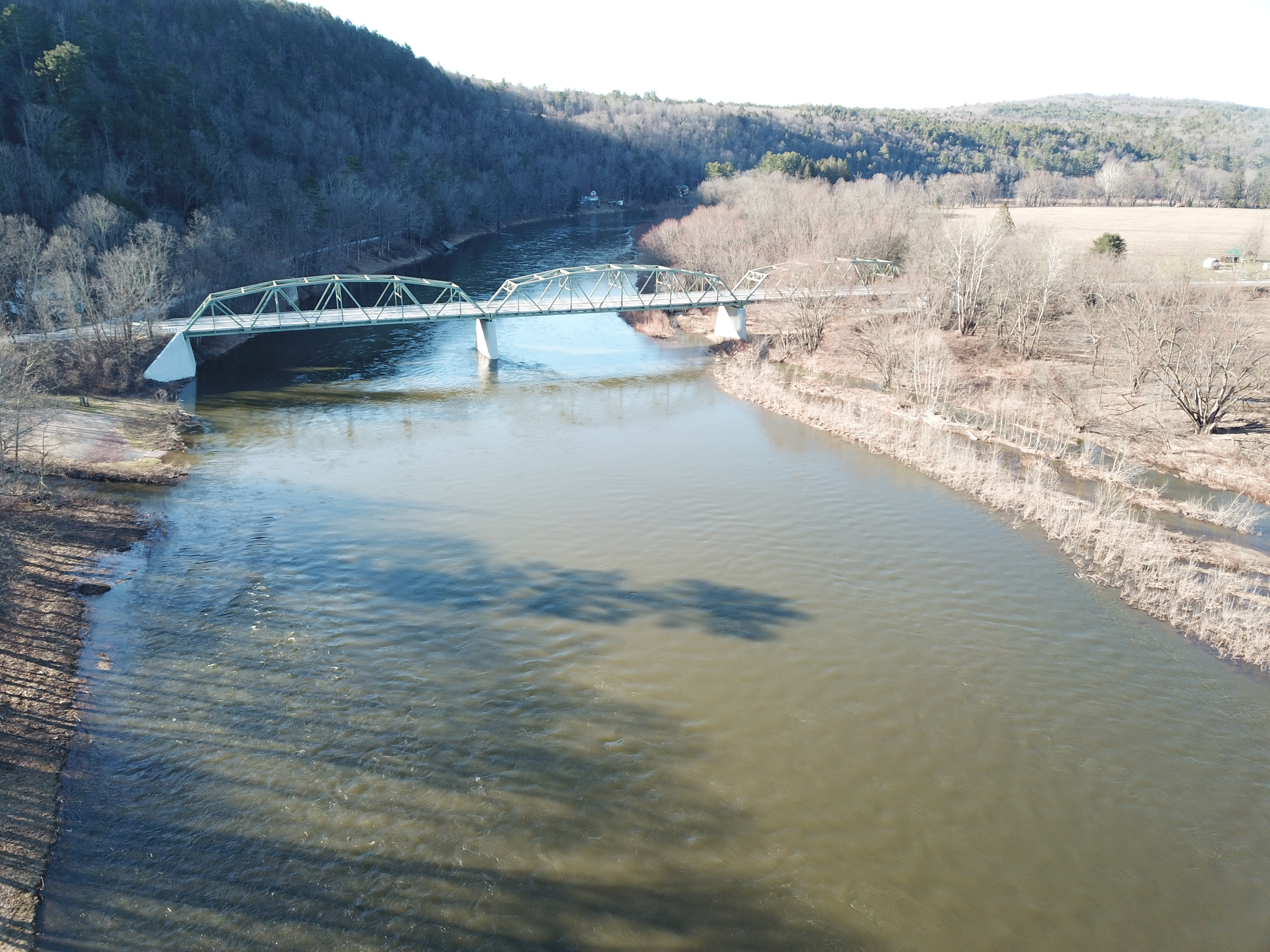
The Cochecton-Damascus Bridge in April 2023, following extensive repairs

New York's Court of Claims, which hears civil cases against the state, was not convinced. The statute that created the commission authorized one or both states to enter into contracts to build or repair bridges; it did not give the commission that power. Further, the court said, "[t]he procedure followed and the instruments employed clearly indicate an intention that construction agreement was between the State and the claimant only", naming neither the commission nor Pennsylvania. The latter indeed shared the cost of construction, but that had no bearing on how D'Angelo got compensated.

The court distinguished the case from those against the Port Authority. First, the case had not been brought against the commission, so the analogy failed. Second, the statutes creating the agencies differed greatly in the powers allocated. "The Port Authority is a body corporate, with the power to contract, to construct, to borrow, and to mortgage", the court noted. "The Joint Commission has none of these attributes; it is a joint agency of very limited power."

== See also ==
- List of crossings of the Delaware River
- New York–Pennsylvania Joint Interstate Bridge Commission
