= Callicoon Bridge =

Bridge in the northeastern United States

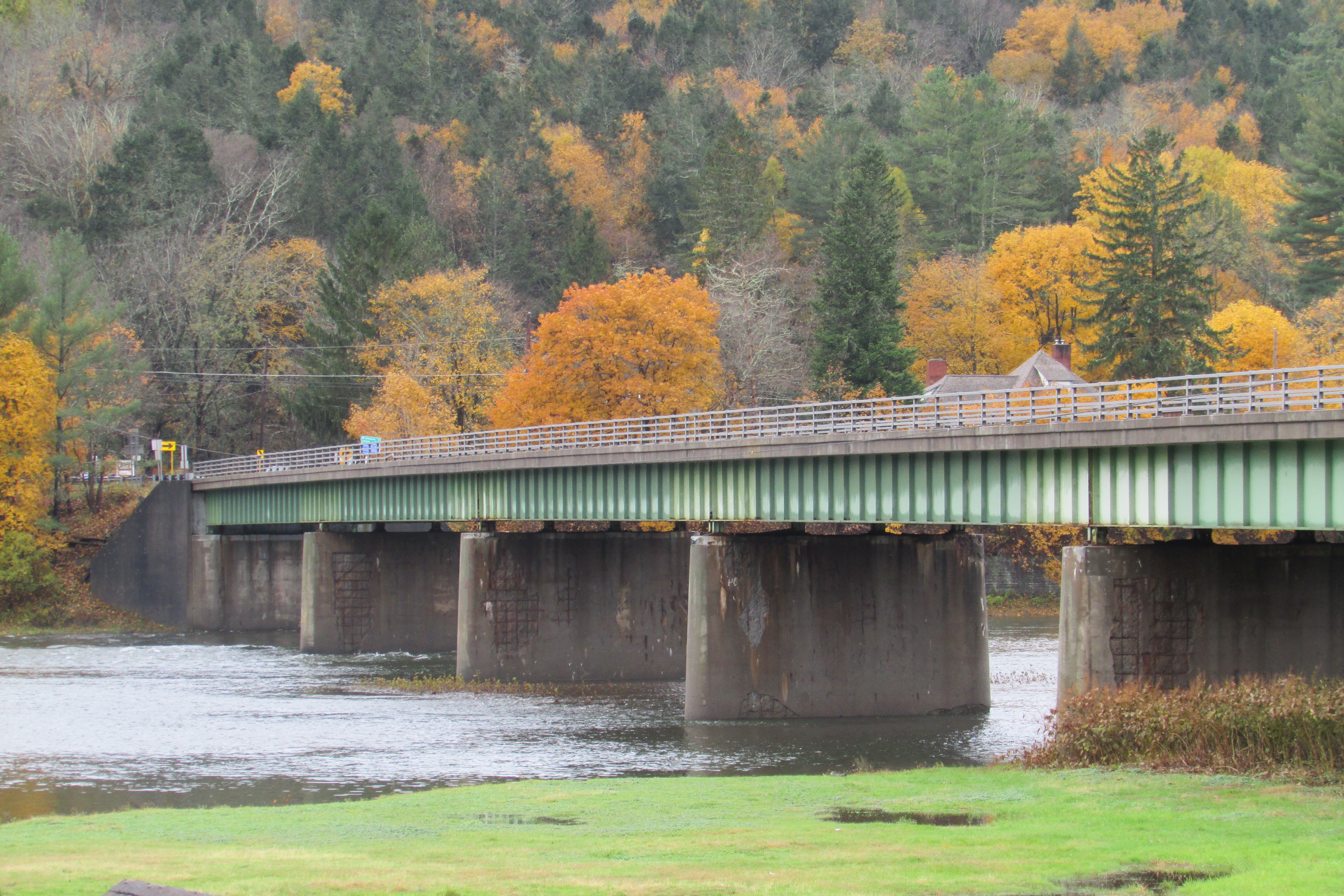
- Coordinates: 41°45′55″N 75°3′38″W
- Carries: Bridge Street
- Crosses: Delaware River
- Locale: Callicoon, New York – Damascus Township, Pennsylvania
- Owner: New York–Pennsylvania Joint Interstate Bridge Commission
- Maintained by: New York–Pennsylvania Joint Interstate Bridge Commission
- National Bridge Inventory: 000000001091670

Characteristics
- Design: Multi-girder
- Material: Steel, concrete
- Total length: 966 feet (294.4 m)
- Width: 25 feet (7.6 m)
- No. of spans: 7

History
- Engineering design by: Binghamton Bridge and Foundation Company
- Opened: August 1, 1962

Statistics
- Daily traffic: 1,322

Location
- Interactive map of Callicoon Bridge

The Callicoon Bridge carries vehicles and pedestrians across the Delaware River between the unincorporated hamlet of Callicoon in the town of Delaware, part of Sullivan County, New York, and Damascus Township in Wayne County, Pennsylvania, both in the United States. It is a multi-girder structure of steel and concrete built in the early 1960s to replace an older bridge built in 1899.

In addition to the river, it crosses the flood plain on its eastern bank in New York created by the confluence of the Delaware and Callicoon Creek, one of its major tributaries in the area, just downstream. As a result, the total length of the bridge's seven spans is 966 feet (294 m). It is the longest bridge on the Upper Delaware. (Note: The Upper Delaware is that stretch of the river from Port Jervis, NY, to where the East and West Branches combine to form the main stem just south of Hancock, NY. The next two longest along that section are the 812-foot (247 m) Barryville–Shohola Bridge downstream from Callicoon, and the Mid-Delaware Bridge between Port Jervis, and Matamoras, PA, at 659 feet (201 m).)

== Structure ==
The Callicoon Bridge uses the multi-girder design, with steel stringers supported by concrete piers and abutments. There are no overhead members. Traffic crosses on an asphalt deck 25 feet (7.6 m) wide, enough to hold one lane in each direction as well as a concrete sidewalk and steel guardrails. The bridge has seven spans of roughly equal length, making it a total of 966 feet (294.4 m) long. This makes it the longest bridge on the Upper Delaware. (Note: See note 1)

== Site ==
The Delaware here runs through a narrow, heavily wooded valley with steep hills rising as high as almost 700 feet (210 m) above it. The bridge crosses the river from New York to Pennsylvania in a northeast-to-southwest direction. Half of the bridge's span crosses an extensive flood plain on the New York side resulting from the confluence of the Delaware and Callicoon Creek immediately downstream. There are also large islands within New York's side immediately upstream. Half the bridge's span is over the flood plain land; most of it is on the New York side of the state line.

On either side are small settlements typical of the sparsely populated regions of the states the Upper Delaware divides; as it is not along a major through route between them, the bridge carries on average 1,322 vehicles a day. The New York approach goes through the unincorporated hamlet of Callicoon, part of the town of Delaware which has a small built-up downtown with many historic buildings. In Pennsylvania several homes in Damascus Township line the roads facing the river, along with one church; there is no commercial development.

=== Approaches ===
Traffic going into Pennsylvania from New York usually comes from two nearby state highways—Route 97, which parallels the Upper Delaware for its entire length, and Route 17B, which terminates at its intersection with Route 97 on the southeast corner of the hamlet after following the creek on its way from Monticello, the Sullivan County seat. Westbound traffic on Route 17B simply continues under the Route 97 overpass onto Mill Street, County Route 133, which crosses under tracks used by the Central New York Railroad and others for freight transport, then turns north to parallel them, becoming Callicoon's Lower Main Street in the process. At Bridge Street a sign tells traffic to turn south again for the bridge. (Note: See videos linked at left)

External videos
- Eastbound approach from Callicoon Road
- Westbound approach from Route 97 northbound

From northbound Route 97, vehicles bound for the bridge are directed onto Upper Main Street, County Route 133A, opposite the intersection with St. Joseph's Seminary Road. After it turns just prior to reaching the railroad tracks, a short spur goes over a grade crossing to Route 133, from which the Bridge Street intersection is a short distance to the north. On southbound 97, a sign directs Pennsylvania-bound drivers to bear off the road at Fremont Street, the north end of Route 133, which they then follow to the spur over the grade crossing.

Access is much simpler from the Pennsylvania side, as the community there is smaller. Vehicles follow either Callicoon Road from the north or River Road from the south, both part of unsigned State Route 1016 which makes a long loop from State Route 191 to the northwest and State Route 371 at the Cochecton–Damascus Bridge, the next crossing downstream. Callicoon and River form a three-way intersection just south of the Callicoon Bridge; the roadway on the Pennsylvania side is designated as unsigned SR 1020.

== History ==
First settled by Europeans in the 1750s, Callicoon first grew as a lumbering community a decade later. At that time the loggers strapped their product to wooden rafts and floated them downriver all the way to the markets of Philadelphia. The journey usually took a week: one particularly daring rafter, Elias Mitchell, made the trip in a mere two days by traveling nonstop. Later, mills were established at Phillipsburg, New Jersey and Easton, Pennsylvania, requiring a shorter trip.

In the mid-19th century, the river was supplemented as Callicoon's connection to the wider world by the New York and Erie Railroad's Delaware Division, which established a station in the small settlement, where trains stopped on their way between the Great Lakes and New York City. It grew in population, and by 1875 the local lumber industry reached its peak, with over 3,000 rafts leaving the village for markets and mills downriver. Other forest-product industries followed. Tanneries set up shop, drawn by the abundant Eastern Hemlock in the woods on both sides of the river, and a paper mill flourished until it burned down in 1879.

The residents soon grew frustrated with having to travel downriver to Cochecton to cross. In 1886 a group of citizens met to organize a bridge-building company. Shares in the newly established Callicoon Bridge Company were priced at $25 ($1000 in modern dollars) and were purchased eagerly. While sentiment was heavily in favor of erecting one, enthusiasm dimmed as it was realized what that would entail—buying land for the approaches on both sides, getting both New York and Pennsylvania to approve the project, selecting a design and hiring a contractor to build the bridge. Getting all those things done took another decade; the process was expedited when the owner of the land on the Pennsylvania side donated it to the company.

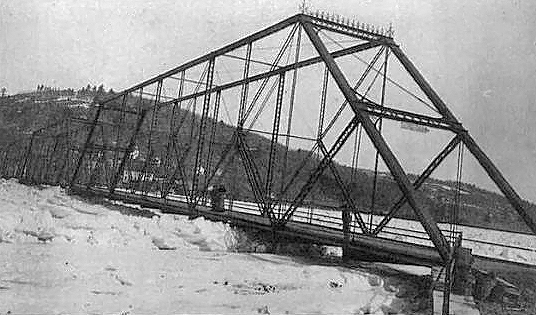
Original Callicoon Bridge during 1904 storm

In the late 1890s the Horseheads Bridge Company, which later built Dingman's Ferry Bridge downriver, was hired to build a truss bridge. It cost $23,180 and opened early in 1899. After being open for free on its first day, it became a toll bridge to recoup the construction costs. No major maintenance was necessary save raising it slightly after a heavy storm in 1904.

In 1923 the company sold the bridge to the states of New York and Pennsylvania for $35,000, who placed it under their joint commission's control. It became a free bridge thereafter, and the company dissolved. No serious maintenance issues presented themselves, not even after the heavy floods that followed Hurricane Diane in 1955.

The bridge was replaced with the current structure shortly thereafter, because it was getting old. More and heavier vehicles were crossing it regularly; the commission decided it was cheaper in the long run to build a new bridge than upgrade the old one. It remained open while the current structure was constructed, slightly downstream, by the Binghamton Bridge and Foundation Company starting in 1961. The new bridge opened with a formal dedication on August 1, 1962. The old bridge was dismantled.

== See also ==
- List of crossings of the Delaware River
- New York–Pennsylvania Joint Interstate Bridge Commission
