= Lordville–Equinunk Bridge =

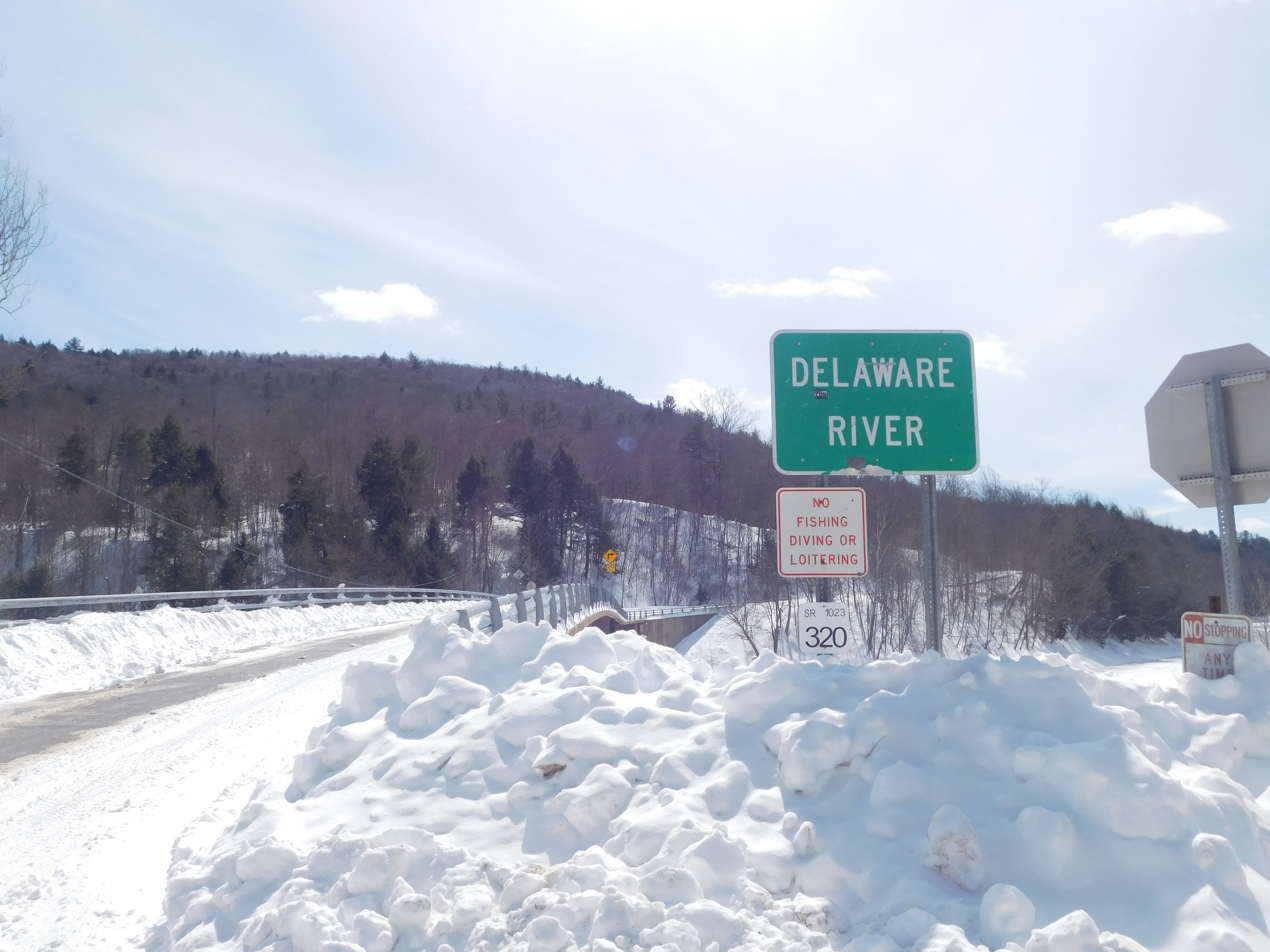
- The Lordville–Equinunk Bridge in March 2017 from the New York side.
- Coordinates: 41.867779°N 75.213880°W
- Carried: Lordville Road (SR 1023)
- Crossed: Delaware River
- Locale: Lordville, New York to Equinunk, Pennsylvania
- Official name: Lordville Equinunk Bridge
- Other name: Lordville Bridge
- Owner: New York–Pennsylvania Joint Interstate Bridge Commission
- Maintained by: New York–Pennsylvania Joint Interstate Bridge Commission

Characteristics
- Design: Girder bridge
- No. of spans: 2
- Piers in water: 1

History
- Construction start: May 1991
- Construction end: 1870, 1904, July 24, 1992
- Collapsed: 1903; November 24, 1986

Statistics
- Toll: None

Location
- Interactive map of Lordville–Equinunk Bridge

The Lordville–Equinunk Bridge is a girder bridge that connects Lordville, New York with Equinunk, Pennsylvania, United States over the Delaware River. The current structure opened on July 24, 1992, five and a half years after the previous suspension bridge was demolished after quick deterioration.

In 1850, George Lord was granted a license to operate a ferry over the Delaware River on this site. In time, the area outgrew the ferry and planned a bridge. This bridge was designed by E. F. Harrington of the John A. Roebling's Sons company as a wire suspension bridge with wooden towers. It opened on January 1, 1870 and was destroyed by flood on October 10, 1903. It was replaced by an eye-bar suspension bridge which opened June 4, 1904. This second bridge lasted until February 1984 when it was closed due to an undermined pier, which caused one tower to lean and the bridge to sag. The bridge was demolished on November 24, 1986. Construction of the replacement bridge started in May 1991, and the new bridge opened in 1992.

The current bridge is the furthest crossing upstream after the Delaware River converges from the east and west branches at Hancock, New York.

== History ==
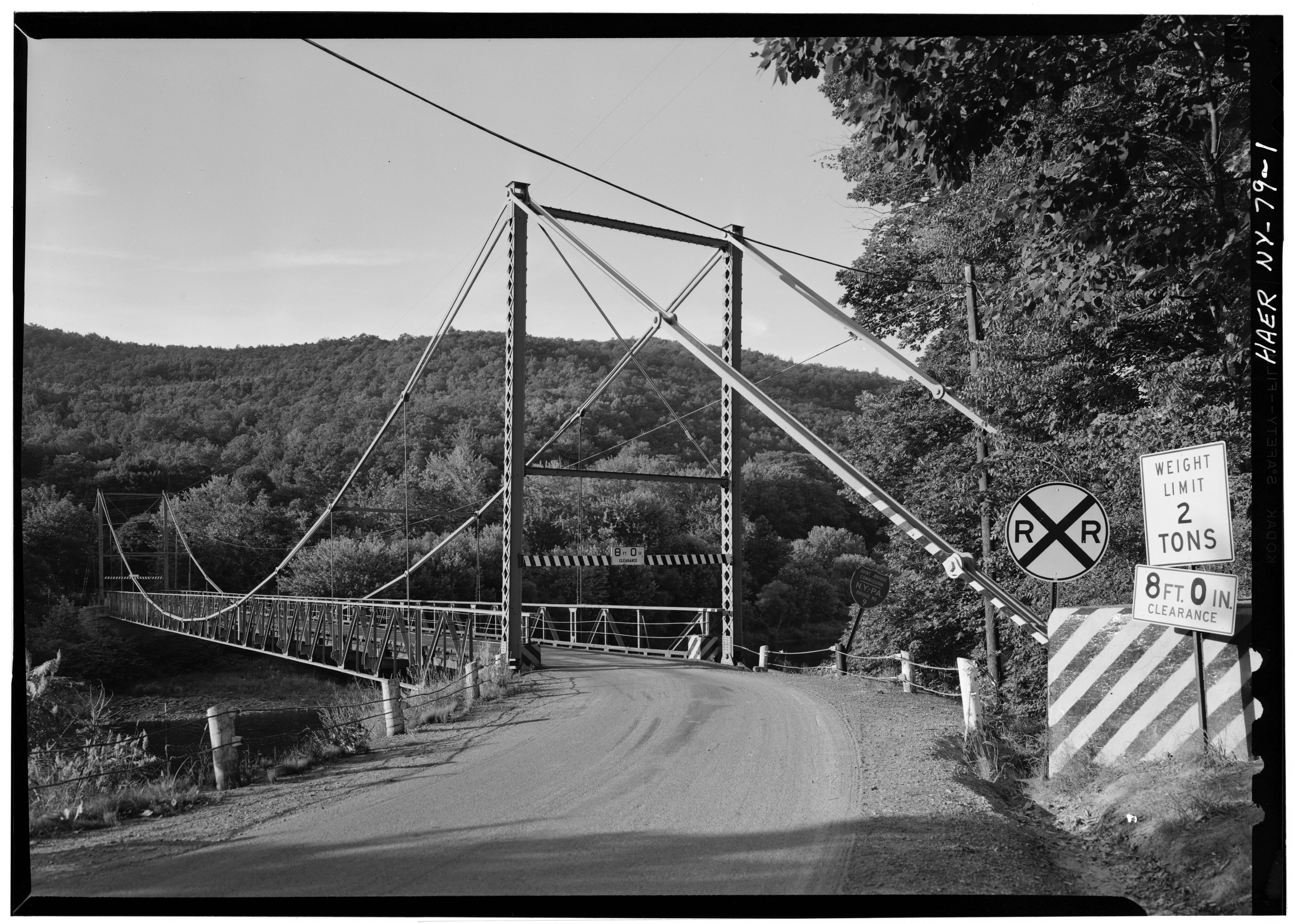
Second suspension bridge, 1904–1986

=== Closure and demolition (1984–1986) ===
Discussions between New York State Department of Transportation (NYSDOT) and Pennsylvania Department of Transportation (PennDOT) about movement in the Pennsylvania abutment in January 1984 resulted in an emergency order to shut down the Lordville–Equinunk Bridge, which occurred on February 28, 1984. For the next six months, the New York–Pennsylvania Joint Interstate Bridge Commission did an investigation of the abutment and its soils, determining in August 1984 that the bridge was beyond repairable and would need to be demolished.

The movement in the soil of the land on the Pennsylvania caused the entire abutment to move with it, causing the tower on that side to twist and cause the bridge deck sag. The bridge problems caused a short trip between Lordville and Equinunk to become a 32-mile (51 km) drive because they would need to use the Hancock Bridge or Kellams Bridge to cross the Delaware River. Locals in Lordville were also concerned about the lack of fire services due to the closure of the bridge, as Lordville relied on the Equinunk Volunteer Fire Department for services. Due to the closure, they would require the Hancock Fire Department in an emergency. Despite the closure to vehicular traffic, people kept walking across the bridge. At least one person in Lordville requested that the New York–Pennsylvania Joint Interstate Bridge Commission pay for lost income.

Engineers from NYSDOT stated that any studies on the possibility of preserving the structure through repair were unlikely to come with a positive result. NYSDOT stated that they would consider building a new bridge and were doing studies to determine if the proposed $2.5 million cost to build a new bridge was worth the money due to the limited traffic. They also stated that both states agreed that if an engineering firm suggested a new bridge built, they would split costs on a new bridge. Expectations in February 1985 is that a preliminary decision would be made in May when the New York–Pennsylvania Joint Interstate Bridge Commission would meet in person.

In June, the Commission voted unanimously to replace the Lordvile–Equinunk Bridge. The Commission determined that the one-lane bridge was no longer viable and that the bridge would be replaced by a two-lane span. However, the Commission stated they would be required to do one more study to determine if they could repair the closed bridge. This study would determine if it would be worth repairing it to the point it could hold 15-ton vehicles or if the replacement would be the only feasible approach. The new bridge would likely not be in the same spot, but would be in the same area between Lordville and Equinunk. If a new bridge were to occur, speculation came that the construction would begin in 1988 and be finished in 1989. Funding of $295,000 went to A. G. Lichtenstein Associates of Fair Lawn, New Jersey in November 1985 for the study the Commission requested.

However, the bridge continued to deteriorate through 1986 and by July, the bridge continued to tilt further towards the Delaware River, noting a movement of 1.5 feet (0.46 m) downwards. Continued movement in the soil affected the bridge and that the support towers on the Pennsylvania side were developing a separation that caused the bridge to keep falling towards the river. As part of the escalated concern, NYSDOT and PennDOT both installed further barricades on the structure, preventing the pedestrian traffic from using the bridge. NYSDOT also posted signs that people would have to stay 50 feet (15 m) from the bridge when fishing or boating due to concerns about imminent collapse. NYSDOT stated that they hoped to remove the bridge by the Spring of 1987, and that if the bridge was on the verge of collapsing, the bridge would be demolished. NYSDOT stated they would employee an engineer to determine what they could do to keep the bridge from falling apart, but expected any project would not be worth the cost. However, the final determination had not been made yet by the Commission.

On October 3, NYSDOT announced that the bridge would be demolished and replaced at the cost of $2 million, rather than spend $400,000 in repairs trying to fix the bridge. NYSDOT would have an emergency contract filed and the bridge would be demolished. Bids for the demolition began on September 18, but no contract had been awarded up to that point. A week later, NYSDOT engineers stated that they would attempt to save a bridge pier in the river for historical purposes before demolishing the bridge. Pennsylvania declared the bridge eligible for the National Register of Historic Places in 1981, but any repairs would take away the structure's historical value to reach a 4-ton capacity. They also stated that the bridge's imminent failure would probably occur in the Spring of 1987 if something was not done. NYSDOT planned to announce a contract for demolition on November 4, 1986. Demolition occurred on November 24, 1986.

=== Construction and reopening (1989–1992) ===
The Pennsylvania–New York Joint Bridge Commission announced in May 1989 that they would replace the Lordville–Equinunk Brige. The contract would be awarded in March 1990 and the new bridge would be in place by the end of 1991. There would have to be a final hearing held in June 1989 before the contract process could begin. However, by December 1989, PennDOT determined that they would not have the money for the new bridge, despite NYSDOT being ready to go ahead with the project and having funding for it and already spent money for the engineering of the new bridge. PennDOT blamed NYSDOT for holding up the new bridge, a statement denied by the latter agency. PennDOT's sudden change of funding upset Manchester Township Supervisors and Wayne County officials, resulting in letters written to Governor Bob Casey Sr. to demand PennDOT fund the bridge project. Governor Casey pressured PennDOT to give answers on what happened to the money for the new bridge.

In late January 1990, NYSDOT officials stated that contracts for a new bridge would begin on March 29, if PennDOT ensured funds were available for their portion of the previously agreed split cost, resulting in construction beginning in the summer of 1990. PennDOT told Wayne County Commissioners that the officials at PennDOT wanted the county to prove who authorized funding for a new bridge. By early March, the bridge project gained supporters in politicians and local groups, including the Upper Delaware Council, and placed pressure on PennDOT. Governor Casey also requested PennDOT work in good faith on finding a solution to the funding crisis. Wayne County Commissioners also presented a petition of signatures demanding a resolution. Wayne County Commissioners and Transportation Secretary Howard Yerusalim met in late March 1990 about the $1.7 million in funding for construction of a new bridge. At the meeting, it seemed clear that Yerusalim was unconvinced the bridge was necessary. Manchester Township Supervisor Chris Wallingford stated that PennDOT would need to take out a loan to fund its half of the bridge but Yerusalim responded that the funding should come from the National Park Service instead because it crosses the Delaware River.

The two sides met again on April 26 and did a presentation to why a new bridge was necessary. Wallingford urged the State Transportation Commission that the traffic counts from the last few years of the previous span's life were inaccurate because of weight restrictions placed on the bridge. At least one member stated funding for the new construction should be restored but that they would hold any decisions until a meeting on July 12. At the yearly meeting of the Pennsylvania–New York Joint Bridge Commission in May 1990, NYSDOT stated that the new bridge would cost $4 million if the project had started on time, $3 million for the construction and $1 million for engineering. They also noted that in the time since the demolition of the previous span, the area in Lordville and Equinunk both grew in population, meaning projected use would be different compared to the previous span. In June 1990, the number agreed to was about 1,000 cars using the bridge per day and that the estimated cost for PennDOT to fund the project was $1.732 million. The State Transportation Commission voted for a new bridge on July 12 and to restore the lost funding for the bridge. When PennDOT would send the money, NYSDOT would then approve the final designs and send out bids for the construction.

The final obstacle before the awarding of the contract came in October 1990, when Wallingford stated that an earthquake study was being done in the area of the bridge and that the completion of the study resulted in the award date on a contract being postponed to February 14, 1991. The firm of Barry, Betta & Led Duke of Albany, New York won the award for the new bridge at a cost of $2,492,687 and that the award would be official in April 1991. Construction would begin soon after the approval. PennDOT's funding arrived in May 1991 at the total of $2 million.

The new bridge opened on July 24, 1992.

== See also ==
- List of bridges documented by the Historic American Engineering Record in New York (state)
- List of bridges documented by the Historic American Engineering Record in Pennsylvania
- List of crossings of the Delaware River
- New York–Pennsylvania Joint Interstate Bridge Commission

== Bibliography ==
- Dale, Frank T. (2003). Bridges Over the Delaware River: A History of Crossings. Rutgers University Press. ISBN 978-0-8135-3213-4.
