= List of crossings of the Delaware River =

This is a list of crossings of the Delaware River from its mouth at the Atlantic Ocean in Delaware and the splitting of the river into two branches at the village of Hancock, New York. From there, the river continues as the East Branch and the West Branch. Crossings along the river include three ferries, 37 automobile bridges and 12 railroad bridges. No tunnels or dams exist along the river.

== Crossings ==
Color	Use
	Closed and/or demolished
	Tolled

=== Delaware–New Jersey ===
Crossing	Image	Carries	Western location	Eastern location	Opened	Closed	Coordinates	Notes
Cape May–Lewes Ferry (Delaware Bay)		US 9	Lewes, Delaware	Cape May, New Jersey	June 30, 1964		38°53′32″N 75°02′38″W	
Forts Ferry Crossing			Fort DuPont State Park, Delaware	Fort Mott, New Jersey	May 4, 2013		39°35′6.7″N 75°33′54.52″W	Operates only April–October
Exelon Transmission Line		Red Lion–Hope Creek 500 kV AC power line	Cedar Creek, Delaware	Salem, New Jersey			39.612°N 75.589°W	
Delaware Memorial Bridge		I-295 / US 40	New Castle, Delaware	Deepwater, New Jersey	August 15, 1951 (eastbound); September 12, 1968 (westbound)		39°41′20″N 75°31′09″W	Twin span.

=== Pennsylvania–New Jersey ===
Crossing	Image	Carries	Western location	Eastern location	Opened	Closed	Coordinates	Notes
Commodore Barry Bridge		US 322 / CR 536	Chester, Pennsylvania	Bridgeport, New Jersey	February 1, 1974		39°49′40″N 75°22′17″W	
Walt Whitman Bridge		I-76	Philadelphia, Pennsylvania	Gloucester City, New Jersey	May 15, 1957		39°54′19″N 75°07′47″W	
RiverLink Ferry (summer)			Philadelphia, Pennsylvania	Camden, New Jersey	March 31, 1992			
Benjamin Franklin Bridge		I-676 / US 30; PATCO PATCO Speedline	Philadelphia, Pennsylvania	Camden, New Jersey	July 1, 1926		39°57′10″N 75°08′05″W	
Delair Bridge		CSAO Delair Branch; Atlantic City Line	Philadelphia, Pennsylvania	Pennsauken, New Jersey	April 19, 1896		39°58′57″N 75°04′08″W	
Betsy Ross Bridge		Route 90	Philadelphia, Pennsylvania	Pennsauken, New Jersey	April 30, 1976		39°59′05″N 75°03′58″W	
Tacony–Palmyra Bridge		PA 73; Route 73	Philadelphia, Pennsylvania	Palmyra, New Jersey	August 14, 1929		40°00′45″N 75°02′36″W	
Burlington–Bristol Bridge		PA 413; Route 413	Bristol Township, Pennsylvania	Burlington, New Jersey	May 2, 1931		40°04′53″N 74°52′10″W	
Delaware River–Turnpike Toll Bridge		I-95; Penna Turnpike; N.J. Turnpike	Bristol Township, Pennsylvania	Burlington Township, New Jersey	May 25, 1956		40°07′02″N 74°49′49″W	
Morrisville–Trenton Railroad Bridge		Northeast Corridor; Trenton Line; Northeast Corridor Morrisville Yard access	Morrisville, Pennsylvania	Trenton, New Jersey	August 23, 1903		40.2082°N 74.7672°W	
Trenton–Morrisville Toll Bridge		US 1	Morrisville, Pennsylvania	Trenton, New Jersey	December 1, 1952		40.2092°N 74.7677°W	
Lower Trenton Bridge		US 1 BUS	Morrisville, Pennsylvania	Trenton, New Jersey	January 19, 1929		40.2105°N 74.7683°W	
Calhoun Street Bridge		East Trenton Avenue; Calhoun Street	Morrisville, Pennsylvania	Trenton, New Jersey	October 20, 1884		40.22001°N 74.77787°W	
West Trenton Railroad Bridge		CSX Trenton Subdivision; West Trenton Line	Yardley, Pennsylvania	Ewing Township, New Jersey	August 29, 1913		40.2417°N 74.8241°W	
Yardley–Wilburtha Bridge			Yardley, Pennsylvania	Ewing Township, New Jersey	December 26, 1904	May 3, 1961	40.246°N 74.8356°W	Destroyed by flooding from Hurricane Diane in August 1955, replaced by a temporary bridge until May 1961, when it was closed due to being structurally unsafe and usurped in purpose by the Scudder Falls Bridge.
Scudder Falls Bridge		I-295	Lower Makefield Township, Pennsylvania	Ewing Township, New Jersey	July 9, 2019 (upstream); August 18, 2021 (downstream)		40°15′31″N 74°50′50″W	
Washington Crossing Bridge			Upper Makefield Township, Pennsylvania	Hopewell Township, New Jersey	April 11, 1905		40°17′43″N 74°52′5″W	
New Hope–Lambertville Bridge		PA 179; Route 179	New Hope, Pennsylvania	Lambertville, New Jersey	August 22, 1904		40°21′53″N 74°56′53″W	
New Hope–Lambertville Toll Bridge		US 202	Solebury Township, Pennsylvania	Delaware Township, New Jersey	July 22, 1971		40°22′45″N 74°57′19″W	
Centre Bridge–Stockton Bridge		PA 263	Centre Bridge, Pennsylvania	Stockton, New Jersey	July 16, 1927		40°24′11″N 74°58′46″W	
Lumberville–Raven Rock Bridge		Pedestrians only	Lumberville, Pennsylvania	Raven Rock, New Jersey	November 1947		40.4078°N 75.0373°W	The original covered bridge, built in 1855, was closed to vehicle traffic on February 3, 1944 for safety purposes. Pedestrians were allowed to cross until June 1, 1945 when the bridge was declared unsafe and likely to collapse.
Point Pleasant–Byram Bridge			Point Pleasant, Pennsylvania	Byram, New Jersey	December 22, 1892	August 19, 1955	40.423°N 75.061°W	Destroyed by flooding from Hurricane Diane, the Delaware River Joint Toll Bridge Commission announced in January 1957 that construction of a new bridge was suspended indefinitely due to a need to conserve federal highway funds for more important projects.
Uhlerstown–Frenchtown Bridge		Route 12	Tinicum Township, Pennsylvania	Frenchtown, New Jersey	October 10, 1931		40.5262°N 75.0651°W	
Upper Black Eddy–Milford Bridge			Upper Black Eddy, Pennsylvania	Milford, New Jersey	January 13, 1934		40.5664°N 75.0986°W	
Riegelsville Bridge		Delaware Road	Riegelsville, Pennsylvania	Riegelsville, New Jersey	April 18, 1904		40.59422°N 75.19077°W	
Interstate 78 Toll Bridge		I-78	Williams Township, Pennsylvania	Phillipsburg, New Jersey	November 21, 1989		40.6721°N 75.1778°W	
Lehigh Valley Railroad Bridge		Lehigh Valley Railroad	Easton, Pennsylvania	Phillipsburg, New Jersey			40.687566°N 75.202298°W	
Central Railroad of New Jersey Bridge		Central Railroad of New Jersey	Easton, Pennsylvania	Phillipsburg, New Jersey			40.687784°N 75.202403°W	
Lehigh and Hudson River Railway Bridge		Lehigh and Hudson River Railway	Easton, Pennsylvania	Phillipsburg, New Jersey	October 2, 1890		40.688958°N 75.203299°W	
Northampton Street Bridge			Easton, Pennsylvania	Phillipsburg, New Jersey	Spring 1896		40.691545°N 75.204004°W	
Easton–Phillipsburg Toll Bridge		US 22	Easton, Pennsylvania	Phillipsburg, New Jersey	January 14, 1938		40.6945°N 75.2036°W	
Martins Creek Branch Rail Bridge		Martins Creek Branch	Lower Mount Bethel Township, Pennsylvania	Harmony Township, New Jersey	December 24, 1885		40.7755943°N 75.1736126°W	
Roxburg Branch Rail Bridge		Roxburg Branch	Lower Mount Bethel Township, Pennsylvania	Harmony Township, New Jersey	January 6, 1953		40.7894024°N 75.1159515°W	
Riverton–Belvidere Bridge			Riverton, Pennsylvania	Belvidere, New Jersey	September 6, 1904		40.6945°N 75.2036°W	
Darlington's Bridge at Delaware Station		US 46	Mount Bethel, Pennsylvania	Delaware, New Jersey		April 3, 1954	40.89947°N 75.07480°W	Bridge demolished
Delaware, Lackawanna and Western Railroad Bridge		DL&W Railroad	Mount Bethel, Pennsylvania	Delaware, New Jersey			40.899838°N 75.074937°W	
Portland–Columbia Toll Bridge		Route 94	Portland, Pennsylvania	Columbia, New Jersey	December 1, 1953		40.9216°N 75.0917°W	
Portland–Columbia Pedestrian Bridge		Pedestrians only	Portland, Pennsylvania	Columbia, New Jersey	October 22, 1958		40.92415°N 75.09554°W	Pedestrian bridge replaced a wooden covered bridge that operated from 1869–1955, washed away by damage from Hurricane Diane in August. The final two years of the covered bridge served as a pedestrian only bridge.
Delaware River Viaduct (Lackawanna Cut-Off)			Upper Mount Bethel Township, Pennsylvania	Columbia, New Jersey	December 24, 1911	June 8, 1984	40.9376°N 75.1057°W	
New York, Susquehanna and Western Railroad Bridge		New York, Susquehanna and Western Railroad	Delaware Water Gap, Pennsylvania	Pahaquarry Township, New Jersey (Note: Pahaquarry Township ceased to exist in 1997 when it merged with Hardwick Township.)	October 10, 1882	February 15, 1941	40.990043°N 75.1331291°W	The bridge was abandoned on February 15, 1941 with the abandonment of railroad service to Stroudsburg, Pennsylvania.
Delaware Water Gap Toll Bridge		I-80; Appalachian Trail	Delaware Water Gap, Pennsylvania	Hardwick Township, New Jersey	December 16, 1953		40.9770°N 75.1354°W	
Rosencrans Ferry		Rosenkrans Lane	Lehman Township, Pennsylvania	Walpack Township, New Jersey	1898	May 4, 1945	41.102057°N 74.985761°W	The former Decker ferry was moved to its location between Bushkill and Flatbrookville in 1898. Service ended when a student pilot tore the overhead cable that helped the car ferry operate.
Dingman's Ferry Bridge		PA 739; CR 560	Delaware Township, Pennsylvania	Sandyston Township, New Jersey	August 24, 1900		41.2201°N 74.8593°W	
Milford–Montague Toll Bridge		US 206	Milford, Pennsylvania	Montague Township, New Jersey	December 30, 1953		41.3071°N 74.8002°W	

=== Pennsylvania–New York ===
Crossing	Image	Carries	Western location	Eastern location	Opened	Closed	Coordinates	Notes
Interstate 84 Bridge		I-84	Matamoras, Pennsylvania	Port Jervis, New York	August 27, 1970		41.357818°N 74.695372°W	
Mid-Delaware Bridge		US 6 / US 209	Matamoras, Pennsylvania	Port Jervis, New York	October 9–18, 1939		41°22′18″N 74°41′52″W	
Millrift Railroad Bridge		Norfolk Southern Railroad	Millrift, Pennsylvania	Sparrowbush, New York			41°24′23.4″N 74°44′30.4″W	
Pond Eddy Bridge		SR 1011; CR 41	Pond Eddy, New York	Pond Eddy, Pennsylvania	November 5, 2018		41.439167°N 74.820278°W	Replaced bridge built in 1904 that had become structurally unsafe. The span was demolished from November 5–November 16, 2018.
Barryville–Shohola Bridge		PA 434; NY 55 / CR 11	Shohola Township, Pennsylvania	Barryville, New York	October 26, 2006		41.4758°N 74.9128°W	
Roebling's Delaware Aqueduct		CR 168	Lackawaxen, Pennsylvania	Minisink Ford, New York	April 26, 1849		41.482571°N 74.9844105°W	
Tusten Station Railroad Bridge		Norfolk Southern Railroad	Shohola Township, Pennsylvania	Tusten, New York	c. October 1904		41°33′53.6″N 75°01′51.0″W	
Narrowsburg–Darbytown Bridge		PA 652; NY 52 / CR 24	Darbytown, Pennsylvania	Narrowsburg, New York	April 16, 1953		41.609715°N 75.061855°W	
Skinners Falls–Milanville Bridge		SR 1002; Skinners Falls Road	Milanville, Pennsylvania	Skinners Falls, New York	November 1902	October 16, 2019	41.669626°N 75.05835°E	Bridge demolished from April 17–April 21, 2025 after being declared unsafe.
Cochecton–Damascus Bridge		PA 371	Damascus Township, Pennsylvania	Cochecton, New York	August 31, 1953		41.70485°N 75.06699°W	
Callicoon Bridge		CR 133	Damascus Township, Pennsylvania	Callicoon, New York	August 1, 1962		41.76528°N 75.06056°W	
Kellams Bridge		Kellam Bridge Road	Stalker, Pennsylvania	Hankins, New York	July 1889		41.823333°N 75.113611°W	
Lordville–Equinunk Bridge		SR 1023	Equinunk, Pennsylvania	Lordville, New York	July 24, 1992		41.867779°N 75.21388°W	

== See also ==
- George Washington's crossing of the Delaware River

== Bibliography ==
- Dale, Frank T. (2003). Bridges Over The Delaware River: A History of Crossings. Piscataway, New Jersey: Rutgers University Press. ISBN 978-0-8135-3213-4.
- Mohowski, Robert E. (2003). The New York, Susquehanna & Western Railroad. Baltimore: Johns Hopkins University Press. ISBN 9780801872228.
