= Narrowsburg–Darbytown Bridge =

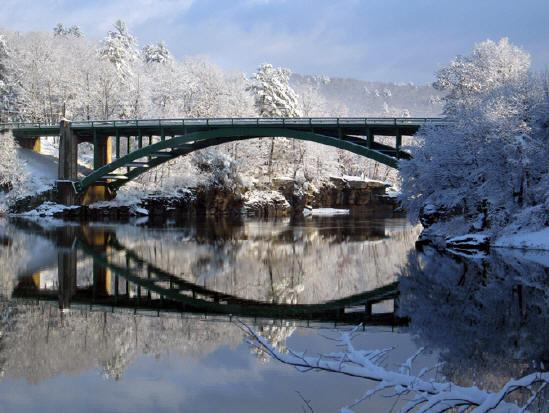
- Elevation in winter
- Coordinates: 41.609715°N 75.061855°W
- Carries: 2 lanes of PA 652 and NY 52
- Crosses: Delaware River
- Locale: Darbytown, Pennsylvania and Narrowsburg, New York
- Official name: Narrowsburg–Darbytown Bridge
- Owner: New York–Pennsylvania Joint Interstate Bridge Commission
- Maintained by: New York–Pennsylvania Joint Interstate Bridge Commission

Characteristics
- Design: Steel arch under bridge
- No. of spans: 1
- Piers in water: None

History
- Construction start: April 16, 1953
- Opened: August 31, 1954

Location
- Interactive map of Narrowsburg–Darbytown Bridge

The Narrowsburg–Darbytown Bridge is an arch under bridge spanning the Delaware River between Darbytown, Pennsylvania and Narrowsburg, New York. It carries Pennsylvania Route 652 and New York State Route 52. Narrowsburg is located in the town of Tusten, but the hamlet along the river's edge is known as Narrowsburg because it is the narrowest part of the River.

In either 1810 or 1830, the Narrowsburg Bridge Company obtained a charter to construct a 25-foot-wide bridge (7.6 m) across the narrows, and to charge a toll for its use. The rates of passage were 37 ½ cents for a one-horse wagon, $1 for 4 horses, and 6 cents for a person walking: to put this in perspective, a good laborer could earn one dollar for a full day's work (12–15 hours). The bridge became part of a transportation system, which included the Mount Hope–Lumberland Turnpike, chartered in 1812. This pike ran from Orange County, New York to Honesdale, Pennsylvania and in many places was reinforced by a plank road. Ice and high water apparently took out at least two bridges before 1848.

In 1899, the Oswego Bridge Company constructed an iron structure, which lasted until the present interstate bridge was completed in 1954. It was not until January 12, 1927, that the bridge became toll free, after being purchased by the New York-Pennsylvania Joint Bridge Commission for $55,000.

In 2013, the bridge underwent emergency repairs that were estimated between $200,000 and $250,000. There were also plans announced for the middle of 2017 into 2018 to make structural repairs and paving work. Those plans for repairs, repaving and repainting were done in 2018.

== See also ==
- List of crossings of the Delaware River
- New York–Pennsylvania Joint Interstate Bridge Commission
