= Mid-Delaware Bridge =

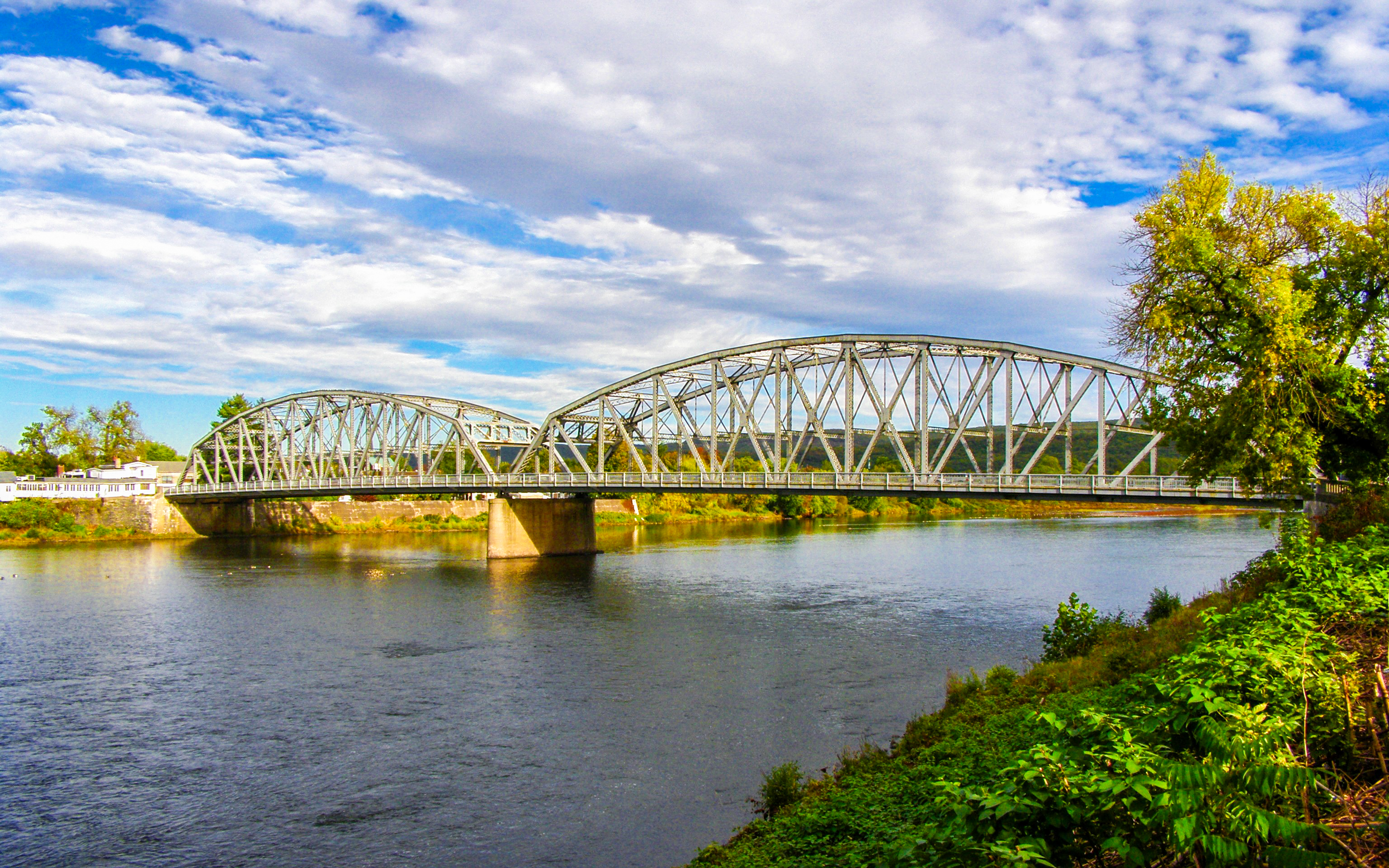
- Coordinates: 41°22′18″N 74°41′52″W
- Carries: Two lanes of US 6 / US 209
- Crosses: Delaware River
- Locale: Port Jervis, New York–Matamoras, Pennsylvania, United States
- Owner: New York–Pennsylvania Joint Interstate Bridge Commission
- Maintained by: New York–Pennsylvania Joint Interstate Bridge Commission

Characteristics
- Design: Continuous steel truss
- Total length: 659 feet (201 m)
- Width: 44 feet (13.4 m)
- Clearance below: 25 feet (7.6 m)

History
- Opened: October 9, 1939 (two lanes); October 18, 1939 (full bridge)

Location
- Interactive map of Mid-Delaware Bridge

The Mid-Delaware Bridge, sometimes known as the Port Jervis–Matamoras Bridge or the Fourth Barrett Bridge, is a continuous truss bridge which carries U.S. Routes 6 and 209 across that river between those two communities and thus the states of New York and Pennsylvania. Although it did have four lanes at one point in its life, it only has two lanes as of today.

== History ==
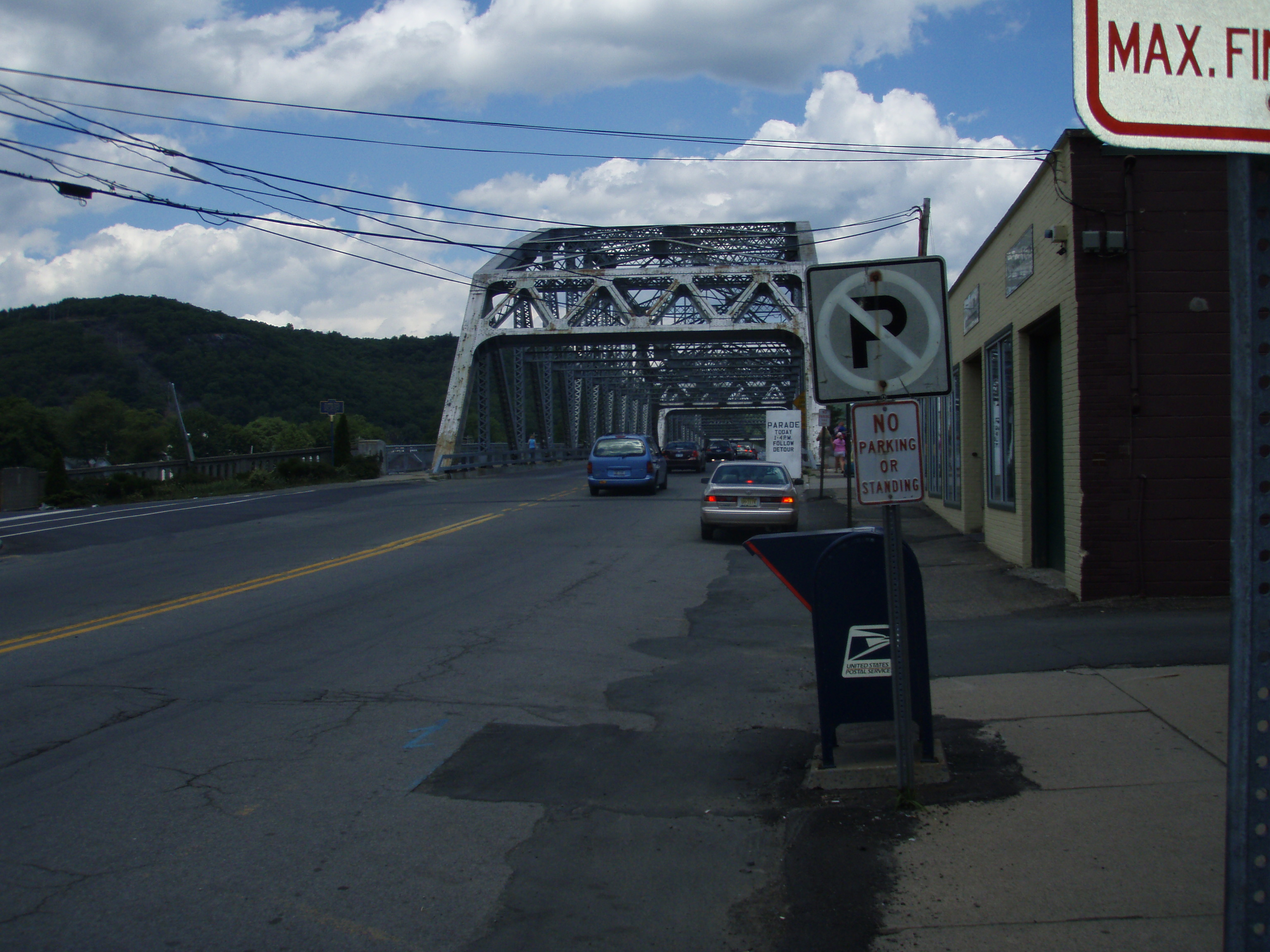
Bridge seen from US 6 and 209 on the Pennsylvania side

The current bridge, built by R.C. Ritz Construction Company in 1939 at a cost of $380,000, is the most recent in a long history of crossings between the two communities. It began in the mid-19th century, when the local Milford and Matamoras Railroad settled a dispute with the larger, growing Erie Railroad with the latter's assent to a law requiring that it construct a bridge across the Delaware at Matamoras that could carry both road and rail traffic. It was supposed to have been completed by 1852, but due to the railroad's unsuccessful efforts to have the law requiring the bridge declared unconstitutional it only began building it that year. It was finished in 1854.

In 1870 that bridge was destroyed in a storm. Directors of the Milford and Matamoras confronted Jay Gould about this in New York when the Erie showed no apparent interest in immediately rebuilding it. He told them the railroad had sold its interest in the bridge to another company, which turned out to be a dummy corporation. A new railroad bridge was built upstream.

Port Jervis businessmen led by Charles St. John frustrated by the delays formed the Barrett Bridge Company to build a suspension bridge designed by John A. Roebling. The bridge which had two spans of 325 feet (99 m) opened in 1872. In March 1875 an ice dam on the Delaware upstream broke and in the ensuing flood, it took out the newly built railroad bridge above the Barrett Bridge. The rail bridge then took out sections of the Barrett Bridge which floated 25 miles (40 km) downstream but were relatively undamaged. They were carted back and reassembled within a few weeks.

A severe flood hit the Delaware River valley in October 1903. Rising waters tore the bridge away from the Matamoras side at 8:30am due to pier damage. The bridge came loose from the middle pier and overturned in the water. Of four people on the bridge, three were killed when the bridge overturned: a prescription clerk, a Catholic priest, and a butcher shop employee. Theodore Durant, a local resident, managed to acquire a board from the collapsing bridge and rode it until he got to a nearby tree, climbing it.

A new Barrett Bridge was built shortly thereafter, using a design similar to the current bridge. In 1922 it was taken over by the new Joint Interstate Bridge Commission set up by the two states to manage their Delaware River bridges; tolls were eliminated.

The Barrett Bridge lasted until October 18, 1939, when a new bridge crossing the span was completed. Two lanes of the new bridge opened on October 9. Demolition of the old bridge began that same day and lasted through November 26.

It would be the only crossing in the area until Interstate 84 was completed in the 1960s with a bridge less than a mile downstream. The Mid-Delaware has proven hardier than its predecessors, standing firm through the post-hurricane flooding in 1955. However, it was closed during the 2006 flooding due to the river waters overrunning its approach roads on either side.

In June 2007, the Commission approved $550,000 worth of work to be completed in 2008. The abutment back walls on both sides, and the pier expansion dam, will be repaired.

In July 2024, the Commission awarded a $14.3 million dollar contract to J.D. Eckman, Inc. to rehabilitate the superstructure, as well as an additional $250,000 for it substructure. This project was to replace the open grate steel deck with a reinforced concrete deck, as well as the pedestrian walkways. As well as blast removal of all paint and corrosion, repainting of all steel surfaces, and replacement of the guide rails. Rehabilitation work began in March 2025, and is scheduled to complete in 2027. The Commission had previously approved $5.89 million towards steel member repairs. When the rehabilitation project is complete, the bridge will have two 11-foot travel lanes, two 9-foot six shoulders, and two 5-foot sidewalks on either side.

== See also ==
- List of crossings of the Delaware River
- New York–Pennsylvania Joint Interstate Bridge Commission
