= Hancock Bridge (Delaware River) =

Lake Como–Hancock Bridge
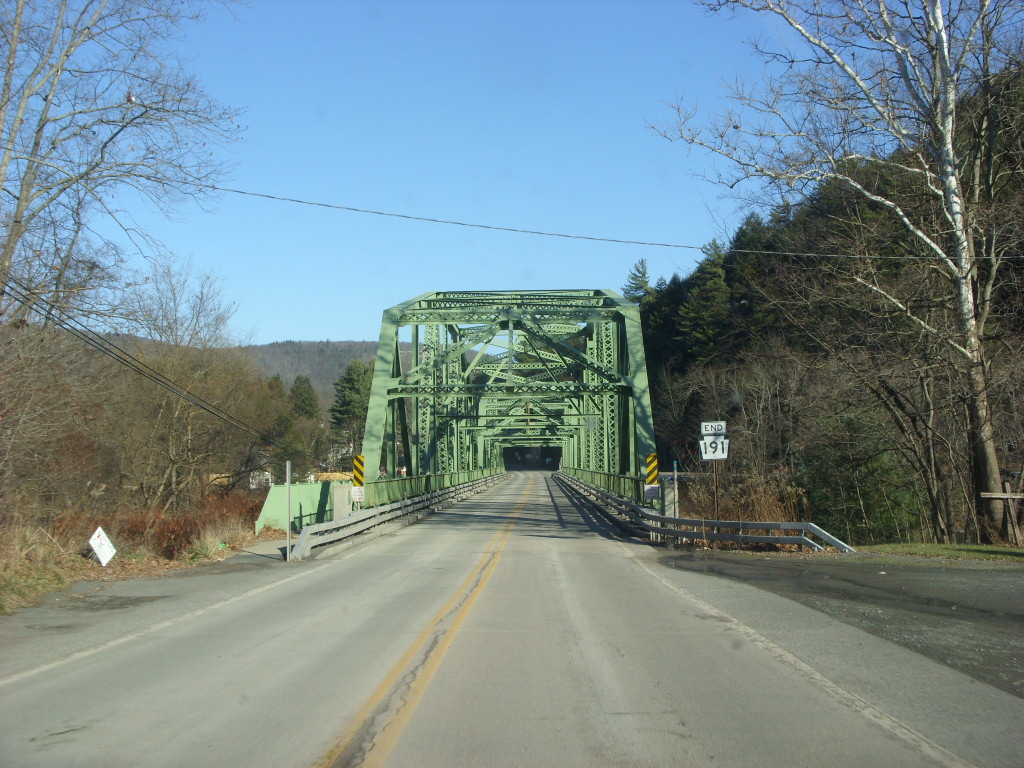
- Coordinates: 41.952385115493605°N 75.29124118434935°W
- Carries: 2 lanes
- Crosses: West Branch Delaware River
- Locale: Starlight, Pennsylvania and Hancock, New York
- Other name: Hancock Bridge

Location
- Interactive map of Lake Como–Hancock Bridge

Hancock East Branch Bridge Bridge
- Coordinates: 41.95277556959036°N 75.27704876840274°W
- Carries: 2 lanes
- Crosses: East Branch Delaware River
- Locale: Hancock, New York
- Other name: Hancock Bridge

Location
- Interactive map of Hancock East Branch Bridge Bridge

The Lake Como–Hancock Bridge, commonly referred to as the Hancock Bridge is a series of two bridges crossing the east and west branches of the Delaware River after the river splits at Hancock, New York. Originally, both the west branch and east branch bridges were truss bridges. However, the east branch bridge was replaced by a girder bridge in 2005.

== About the bridge ==
The bridge goes over the Delaware River at the West Branch. The bridge is 465.9 feet (142.0 m) long. The bridge services two areas, Wayne County, Pennsylvania, and Delaware County, New York.
