= Milanville, Pennsylvania =

Unincorporated community in Pennsylvania, US

- Village
- Village of Milanville
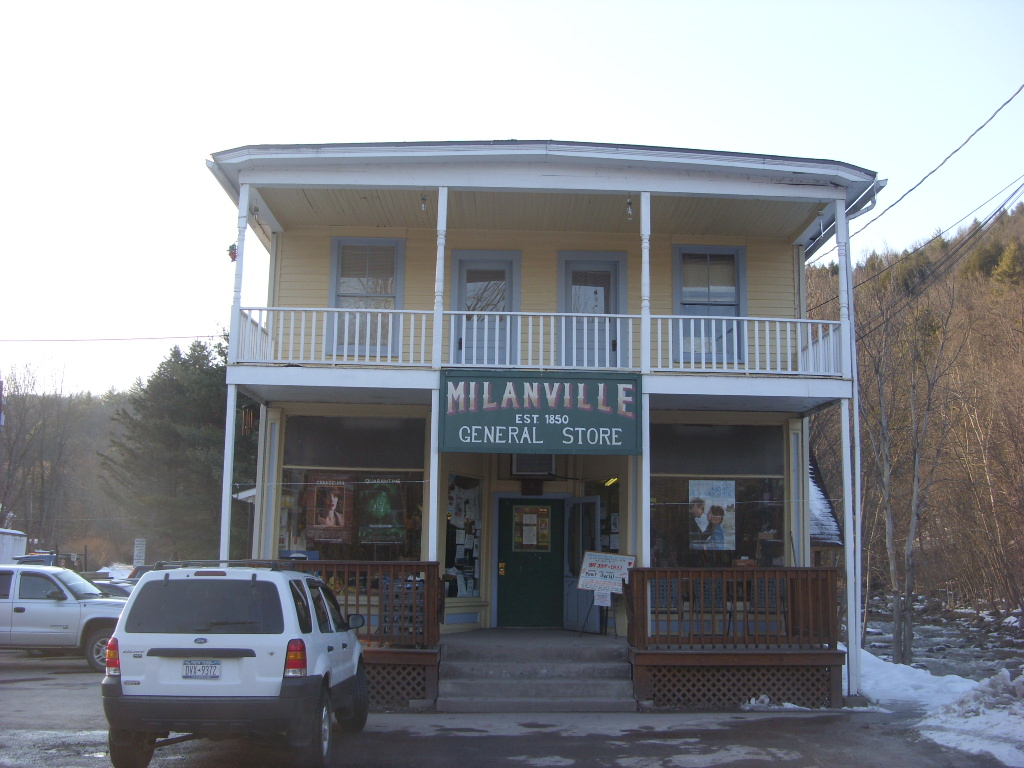
- The Milanville General Store in Milanville.

- Location within Pennsylvania. Milanville, Pennsylvania (the United States)
- Coordinates: 41°40′17″N 75°03′55″W
- Country: United States
- State: Pennsylvania
- U.S. Congressional District: PA-10
- School District: Wayne Highlands; Region I
- County: Wayne
- Magisterial District: 22-3-04
- Township: Damascus
- Named after: Milan, Italy
- Elevation: 750 ft (230 m)
- Time zone: UTC-5 (Eastern (EST))
  - Summer (DST): UTC-4 (Eastern Daylight (EDT))
- ZIP code: 18443
- Area code: 570
- GNIS feature ID: 1181094
- FIPS code: 42-127-18104-49328
- Waterways: Calkins Creek (North and South Branches)

Milanville is a village in Damascus Township, Wayne County, Pennsylvania, United States.

== Geography ==
Milanville is located along the Delaware River and the New York border north of Narrowsburg, New York.
