= Matamoras, Pennsylvania =

Borough in Pennsylvania, US

- Borough
- Borough of Matamoras
- A view of Matamoras from the hills behind the town. Mid-Delaware Bridge connects it to Port Jervis, New York
- Interactive map of Matamoras, Pennsylvania
- Coordinates: 41°22′N 74°42′W
- Country: United States
- State: Pennsylvania
- County: Pike
- Incorporated: January 18, 1905; 121 years ago

Government
  - Mayor: Cory Homer

Area
  - Total: 0.78 sq mi (2.02 km^{2})
  - Land: 0.69 sq mi (1.79 km^{2})
  - Water: 0.089 sq mi (0.23 km^{2})
- Elevation: 427 ft (130 m)

Population (2020)
  - Total: 2,362
  - Density: 3,409.4/sq mi (1,316.37/km^{2})
- Time zone: UTC-5 (EST)
  - Summer (DST): UTC-4 (EDT)
- ZIP code: 18336
- Area code: 570
- FIPS code: 42-48048
- Website: Borough of Matamoras

Matamoras is a borough in Pike County, Pennsylvania, United States. The population was 2,362 at the 2020 census. It is the easternmost municipality of any kind in Pennsylvania. Matamoras is part of the New York–Newark–Jersey City, NY–NJ–PA Metropolitan Statistical Area, as well as the larger New York–Newark, NY–NJ–CT–PA Combined Statistical Area.

== History ==
Matamoras was originally part of Westfall Township. Its name is derived from the Mexican city of Matamoros, which was the first to be occupied by U.S. troops during the Mexican–American War. It was incorporated as a borough on January 18, 1905.

=== Merrill-Ronne Airport ===
On May 31, 1930, the Merrill-Ronne Airport was opened on the eastern side of Matamoras. The Airport was named and dedicated to aviators, Mazel M. Merrill and Edwin Ronne who had crashed and died in the woods near Milford, Pennsylvania. The airport consisted of two large runways and a smaller runway at the north of the airport. The airport was used to train fighter pilots during WWII. The airport closed sometime between 1970 and 1980. After the airport was closed it became Airport park, a local park with many amenities.

== Geography ==
Matamoras is located at 41°22′N 74°42′W (41.3678, −74.7018). It is the easternmost point in Pennsylvania. Across the Delaware River are Port Jervis, New York and Montague, New Jersey. At the nearby confluence of the Delaware and Neversink rivers is the Tri-States Monument, marking the eastern end of the boundary between New York and Pennsylvania.

According to the United States Census Bureau, the borough has a total area of 0.8 sq miles, of which 0.7 square miles (1.8 km^{2}) is land and 0.1 square miles (0.26 km^{2}) (11.54%) is water.

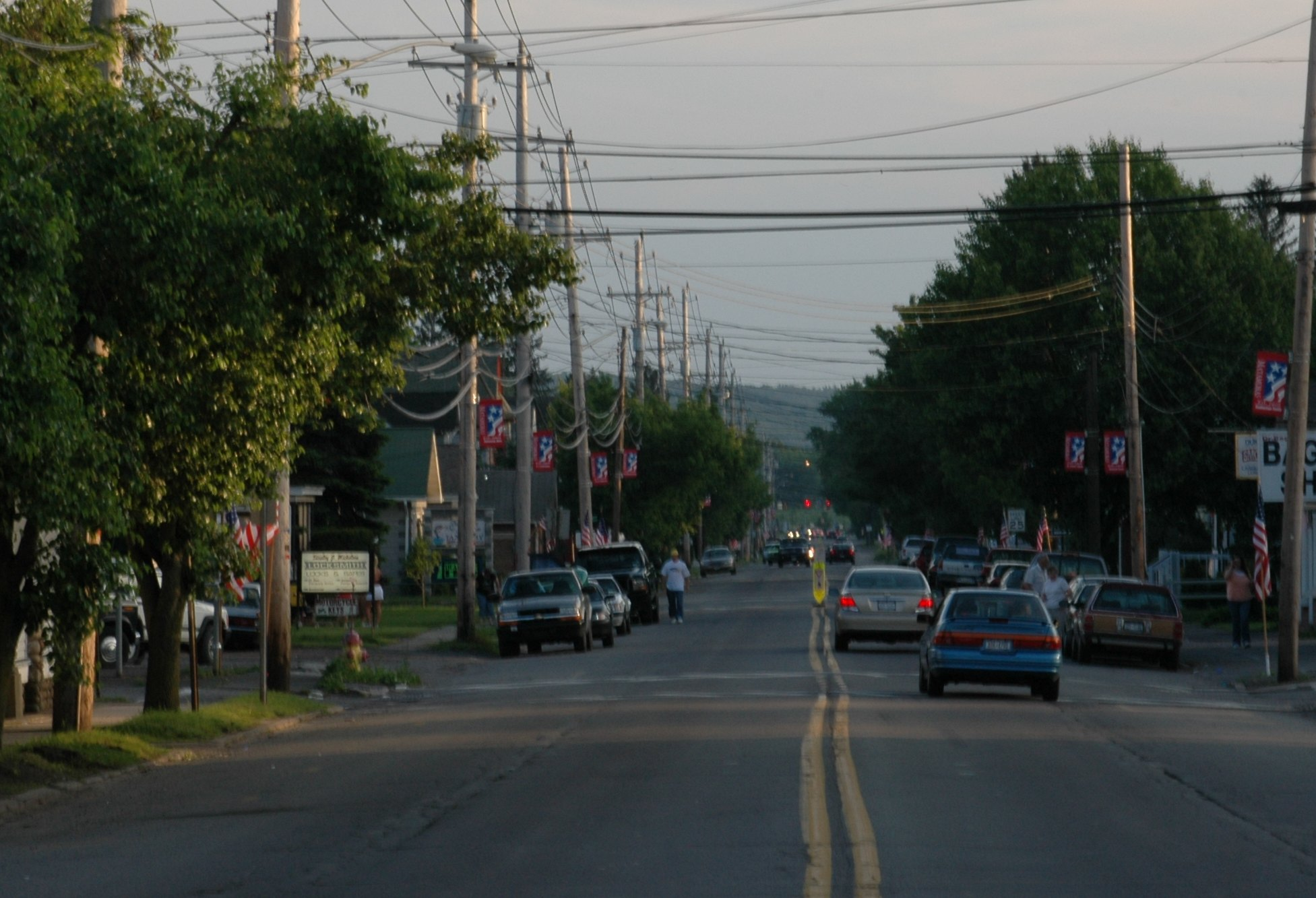
US Routes 6 and 209 as they pass through Matamoras.

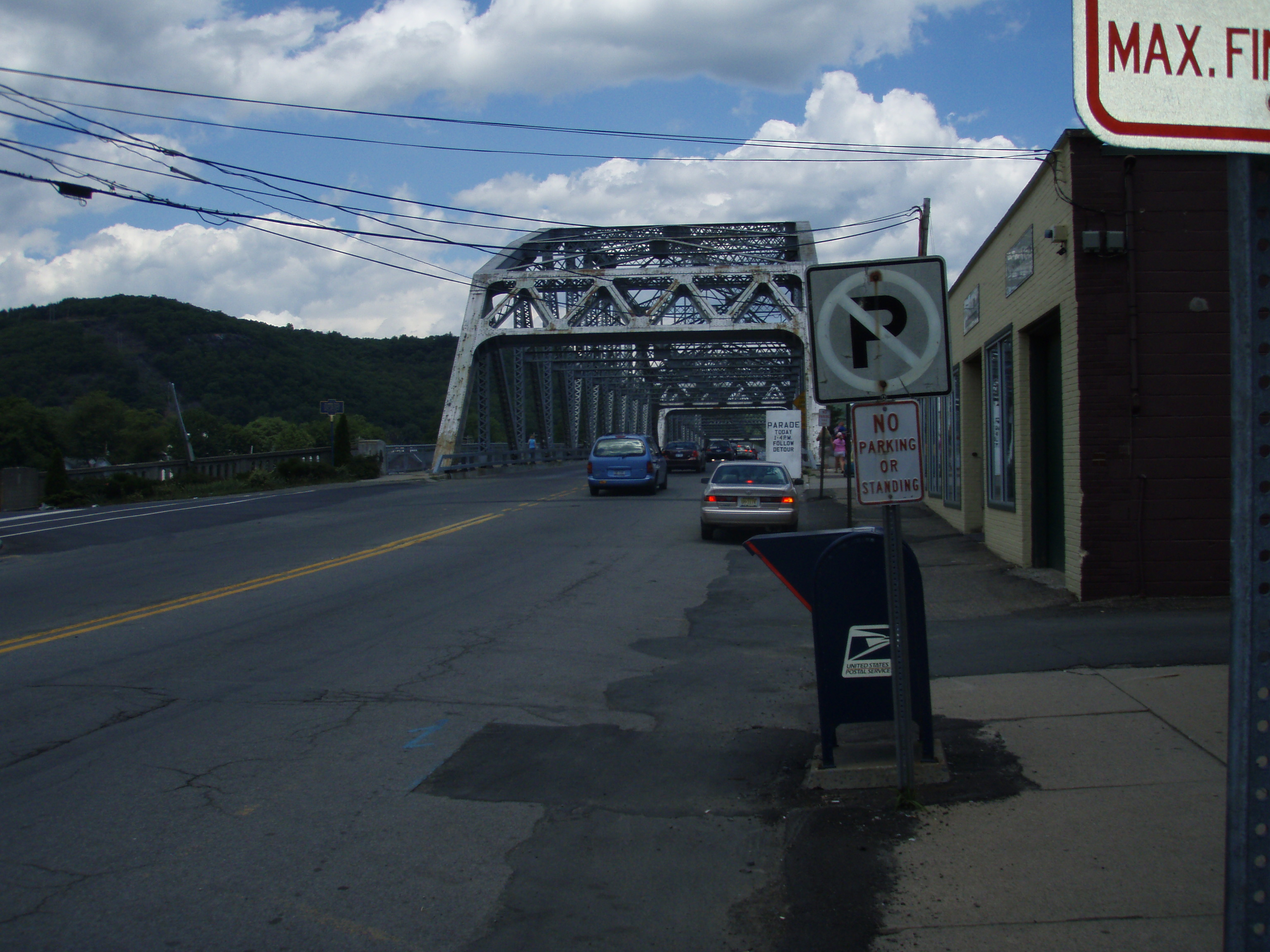
Facing the bridge to Port Jervis, New York on US Routes 6 and 209

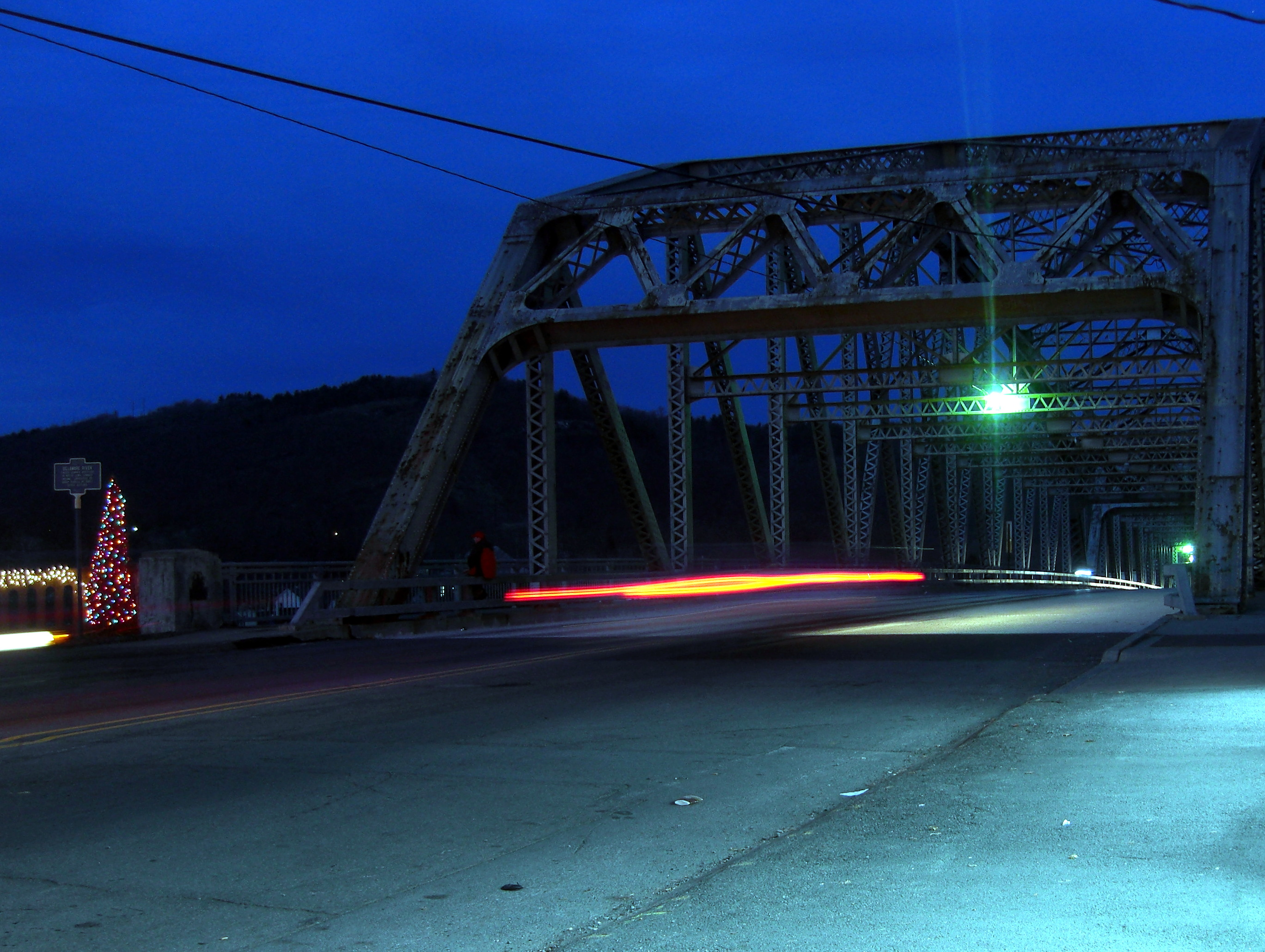
The Mid Delaware Bridge

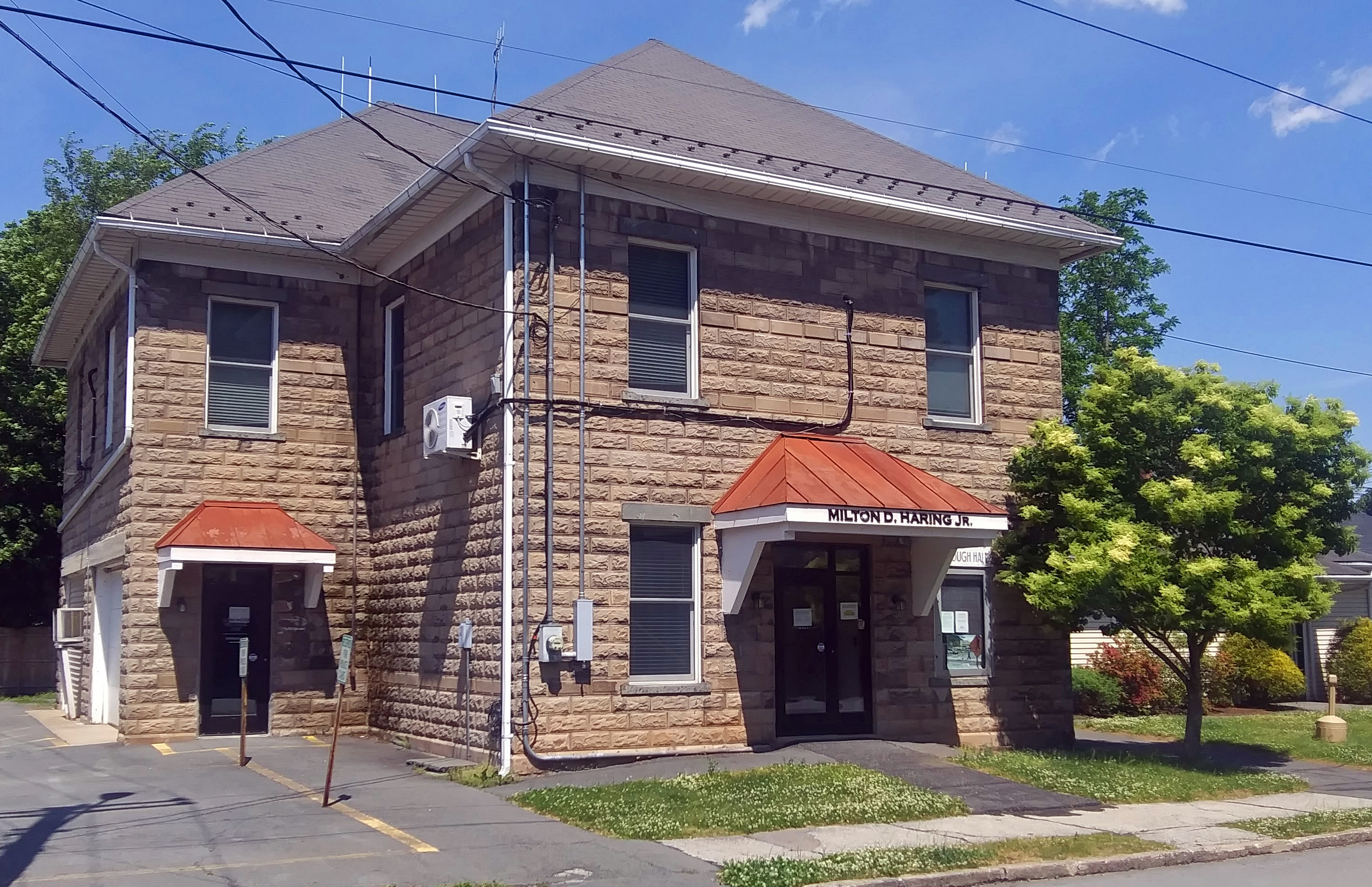
Borough Hall

=== Climate ===
Climate data for Matamoras, Pennsylvania (1991–2020)
Month	Jan	Feb	Mar	Apr	May	Jun	Jul	Aug	Sep	Oct	Nov	Dec	Year
Mean daily maximum °F (°C)	34.2 (1.2)	37.0 (2.8)	45.7 (7.6)	58.7 (14.8)	69.7 (20.9)	77.6 (25.3)	82.0 (27.8)	80.5 (26.9)	73.6 (23.1)	62.1 (16.7)	50.4 (10.2)	39.5 (4.2)	59.3 (15.1)
Daily mean °F (°C)	25.1 (−3.8)	26.9 (−2.8)	35.2 (1.8)	46.5 (8.1)	57.4 (14.1)	66.2 (19.0)	70.3 (21.3)	68.9 (20.5)	62.0 (16.7)	50.4 (10.2)	39.8 (4.3)	31.1 (−0.5)	48.3 (9.1)
Mean daily minimum °F (°C)	15.9 (−8.9)	16.8 (−8.4)	24.8 (−4.0)	34.2 (1.2)	45.1 (7.3)	54.8 (12.7)	58.5 (14.7)	57.4 (14.1)	50.5 (10.3)	38.6 (3.7)	29.3 (−1.5)	22.7 (−5.2)	37.4 (3.0)
Average precipitation inches (mm)	3.14 (80)	2.94 (75)	3.90 (99)	3.90 (99)	3.34 (85)	5.38 (137)	3.70 (94)	4.38 (111)	4.66 (118)	4.67 (119)	3.30 (84)	3.96 (101)	47.27 (1,202)
Average snowfall inches (cm)	11.6 (29)	9.7 (25)	6.8 (17)	1.9 (4.8)	0.0 (0.0)	0.0 (0.0)	0.0 (0.0)	0.0 (0.0)	0.0 (0.0)	0.0 (0.0)	0.8 (2.0)	10.0 (25)	40.8 (102.8)
Source: NOAA

== Demographics ==
Historical population
Census	Pop.	Note	%±
1880	196		—
1910	1,388		—
1920	1,535		10.6%
1930	1,784		16.2%
1940	1,735		−2.7%
1950	1,761		1.5%
1960	2,087		18.5%
1970	2,244		7.5%
1980	2,111		−5.9%
1990	1,934		−8.4%
2000	2,312		19.5%
2010	2,469		6.8%
2020	2,362		−4.3%

As of the census of 2010, there were 2,469 people, 955 households, and 665 families residing in the borough. The population density was 3,527.1/sq mi. There were 1,020 housing units at an average density of 1,457.1 per square mile. The racial makeup of the borough was 93.3% White, 1.4% African American, 0.3% Native American, 1.8% Asian, 0.6% from other races, and 2.7% from two or more races. Hispanic or Latino of any race were 5.5% of the population.

There were 955 households, out of which 33.7% had children under the age of 18 living with them, 48.5% were married couples living together, 14.6% had a female householder with no husband present, and 30.4% were non-families. Of all households 24.9% were made up of individuals, and 12.4% had someone living alone who was 65 years of age or older. The average household size was 2.59 and the average family size was 3.09.

In the borough the population was spread out, with 26.2% under the age of 18, 57.8% from 18 to 64, and 16% who were 65 years of age or older. The median age was 39 years.

The median income for a household in the borough was $37,361, and the median income for a family was $45,917. Males had a median income of $32,875 versus $26,176 for females. The per capita income for the borough was $18,946. About 2.4% of families and 4.0% of the population were below the poverty line, including 1.9% of those under age 18 and 7.4% of those age 65 or over.

== Other ==
- Matamoras is the setting for photographer Amy Stein's Domesticated series.
