= Zane Grey Museum =

Historic house in Pennsylvania, United States

- Zane Grey House
- U.S. National Register of Historic Places
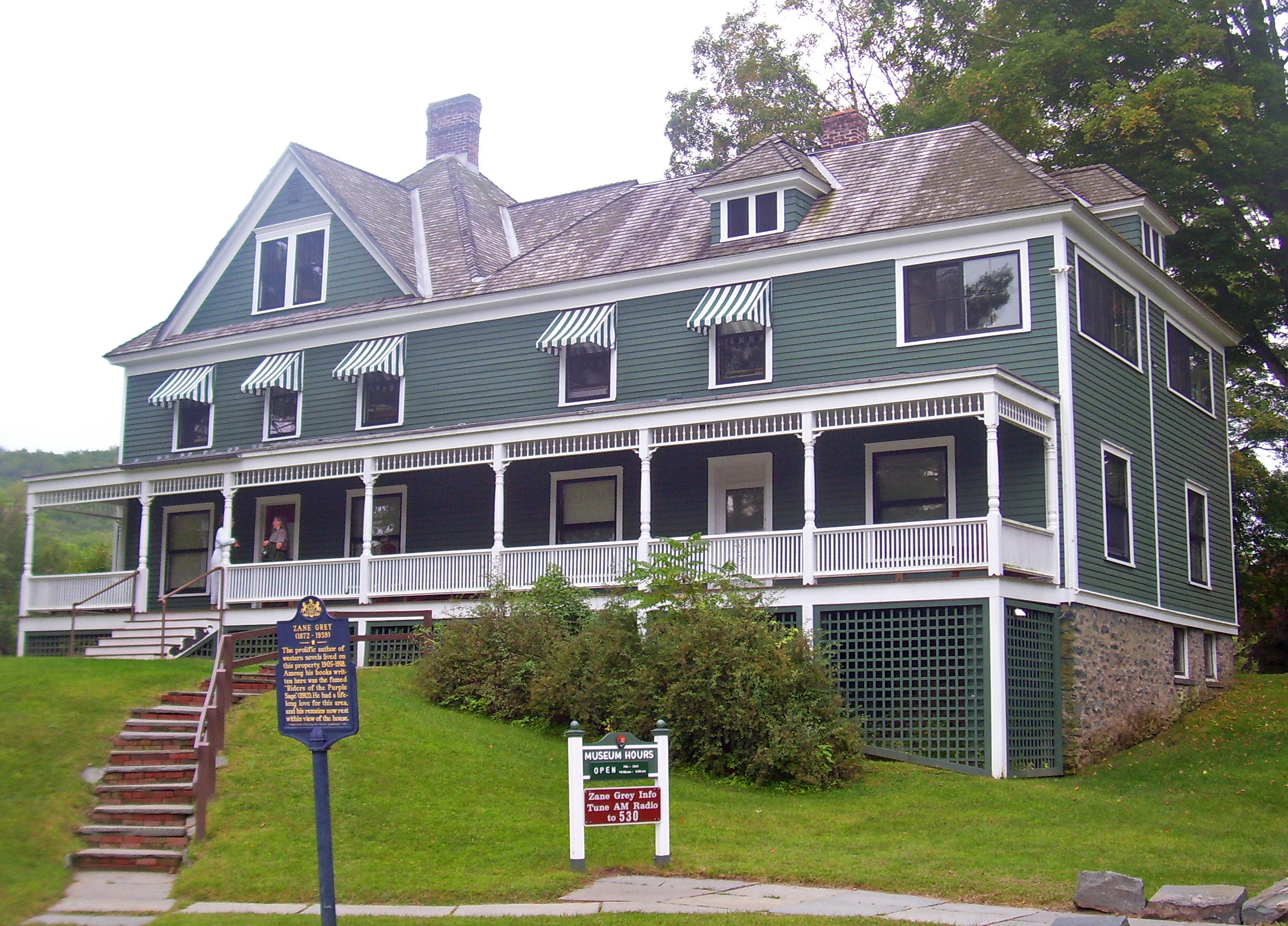
- East elevation and north profile, 2008

- Location within Pennsylvania Location within the United States
- Interactive map showing the location of Zane Grey House
- Location: Lackawaxen Township, Pike County, Pennsylvania
- Coordinates: 41°29′8″N 74°59′16″W
- Built: 1905
- Architect: Romer C. Grey
- NRHP reference No.: 83002283 (original); 11000231 (increase)

Significant dates
- Added to NRHP: May 6, 1983
- Boundary increase: April 29, 2011

The Zane Grey Museum in Lackawaxen Township, Pennsylvania, United States, is a former residence of the author Zane Grey and is now maintained as a museum and operated by the National Park Service (NPS). It is located on the upper Delaware River and is on the National Register of Historic Places. It contains many photographs, artworks, books, furnishings, and other objects of interest associated with Grey and his family.

The house was built in two sections, both from designs by Grey. The first was in 1905 by Zane Grey's brother, Romer Carl "Reddy" Grey; the second seven years later by a neighbor, to serve as a writing studio and library after the success of Riders of the Purple Sage. Grey and his wife moved to California so he could work on screenplays in 1918, but Lackawaxen and the house remained one of his favorite places for the rest of his life. It was added to the Register in 1983.

== Building ==
The house is along Scenic Drive, a short road along the Delaware River north of Roebling's Delaware Aqueduct, an early suspension bridge which still carries vehicle and foot traffic across the river between Pennsylvania and New York. Along the riverfront to the north, it is 300 feet (91 m) to the Delaware's confluence with the Lackawaxen River, the largest tributary of the Upper Delaware in Pennsylvania, resulting in slightly choppier water in front of the house. The grassy, maintained ground slopes gently from Pennsylvania Route 590 to the west toward the river, giving the house's east (front) a view across to undeveloped woods on the New York side in Minisink Ford.

In front of the house, the slope exposes the northern corner more than the southern one. There is a small unpaved parking lot, sign for the museum and state historical marker as well. The house is to the north of a cluster of other buildings in the neighborhood, most notably the former D&H Canal Co. Office, now a bed and breakfast.

The two-story clapboard-sided frame structure rises from an exposed bluestone foundation. It is three bays long by six wide, in an L-shaped plan. The older, east–west–oriented block of the house has a square hipped roof with two large pedimented dormer windows with dentilled lintels on the east and south sides, with a smaller jerkin-roofed dormer complementing the eastern one. The newer wing designed by Grey and built by his brother has a rectangular hipped roof of gentler pitch with three small jerkined dormers. Both roofs are surfaced with diamond-shaped shingles of white asbestos cement and pierced by a single brick chimney per wing.

A single wraparound porch with flat roof, balustrade and bracketed columns runs the length of the south and east elevations, combining two previously separate porches, one of which had lost its original roof in the floods of 1955. White wooden posts mark the house's corners, and the second-story windows have awnings.

Inside, the floor plans reflect the two sections' separate construction. The earlier one has a square plan, the later one a rectangular. Many original finishes and decorations remain. Opposite the original front door at the southeast corner is a brick fireplace trimmed with unglazed terra cotta, including egg-and-dart molding. A T-plan staircase has its original decorative balustrade and newel posts.

The northeast door is the main entrance to the newer wing. It opens onto a living space that runs the length and half the width of the addition. Opposite the door is its fireplace, likewise of brick and topped with a beveled mirror to a height of 7 feet (2.1 m). Behind it the library includes many original trim, particularly a 2-foot-4-inch (0.71 m) deep painted frieze depicting kachina dolls, reflecting Grey's interests in the Southwest. These rooms, and Grey's upstairs studio, house most of the museum exhibits and visitor interest today.

== History ==
A native of Zanesville, Ohio, Grey had established a dental practice in New York City in 1896 but soon grew dissatisfied with the field. He dabbled in semi-professional baseball and wrote his first stories and novels. They were not successful, but by 1905 he had decided to leave dentistry for writing. They had begun the process of building the first part of the house, the southern wing, after seeing the site on a fishing trip that year, and later they moved their families into it.

Grey continued to write westerns, and took two extended research trips to the Southwest over the next several years. He worked, at the time, in a bungalow near the house that is no longer extant. These resulted in Heritage of the Desert in 1911 and Riders of the Purple Sage the following year, his bestselling novel. With the proceeds from the latter work, he designed the study wing. It was built by a neighbor, Gottlieb Kuhn, in 1912.

He continued writing novels there for six more years until the nascent film industry beckoned. He and his wife moved to Altadena, California, where they eventually purchased an estate as he became even more commercially successful as a film producer as well. He remained in California until his 1939 death, but retained the Lackawaxen house for visits east. Both he and his wife are buried in Union Cemetery, not far from the house.

In 1945, Grey's widow sold the house to a friend, who operated it as an inn for 25 years. During that time, in 1955, the building suffered some serious flood damage, tearing off the roof of the first front porch. In 1973, they converted it into the museum, which they sold to the Park Service in 1989.

Flooding in June 2006 left 6 to 8 feet (1.8 to 2.4 m) of water in the basement. The Park Service was able to get the collection to safety, but it was necessary to thoroughly dehumidify the space before reopening the museum.

== Gallery ==
Historical photographs of the Zane Grey House, 1933
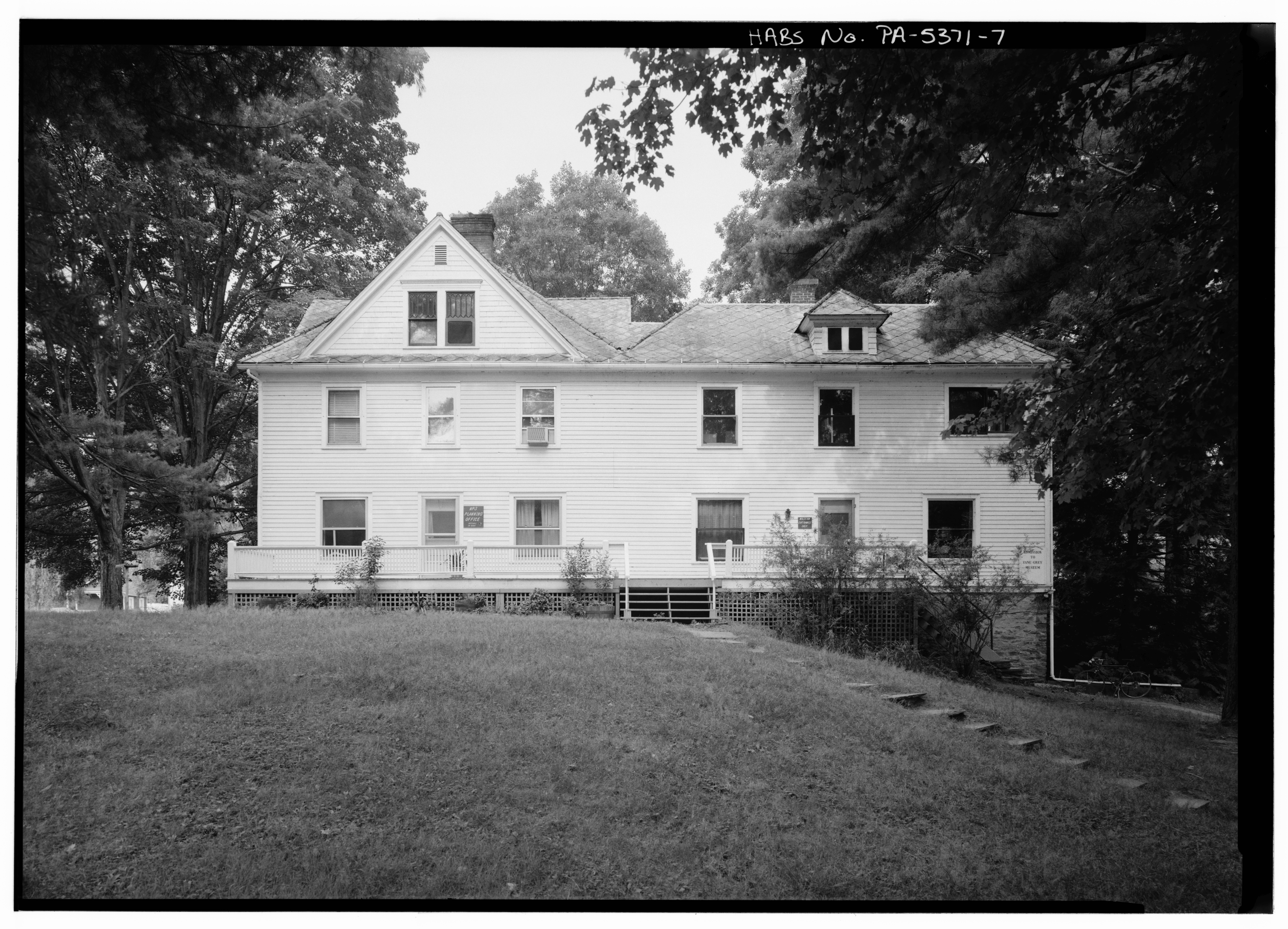
Exterior, west facade

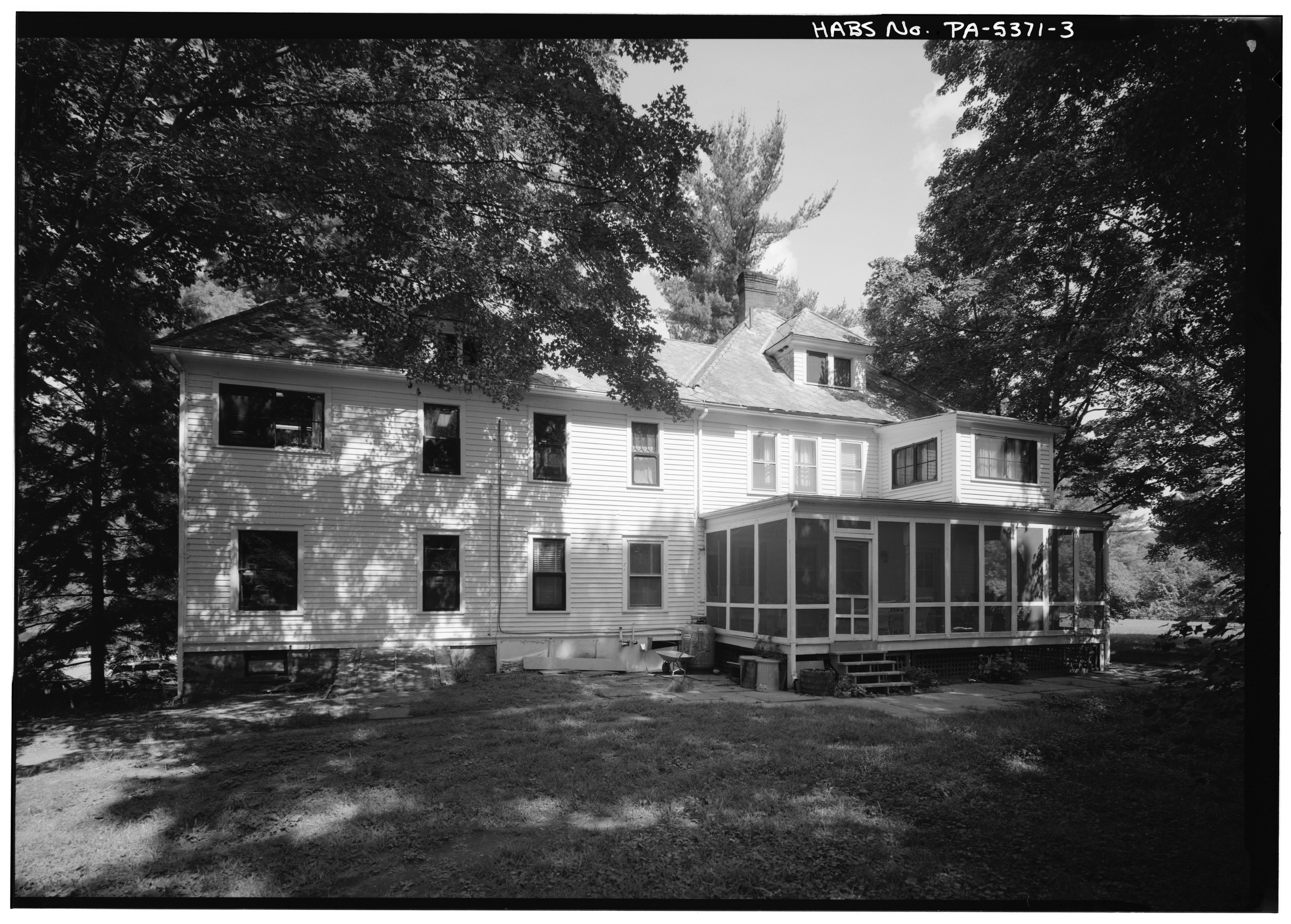
Exterior, northwest facade

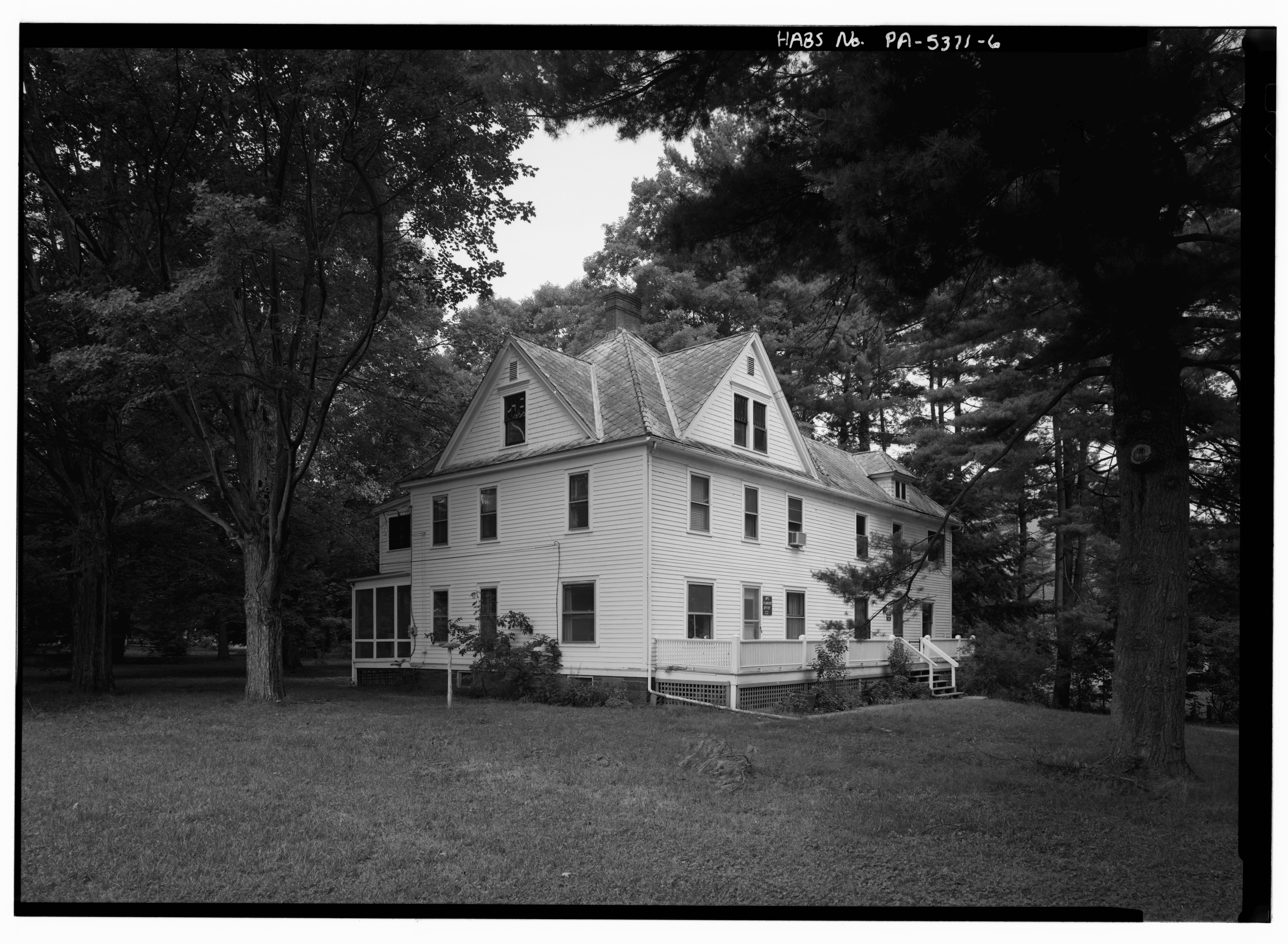
Exterior, southeast facade

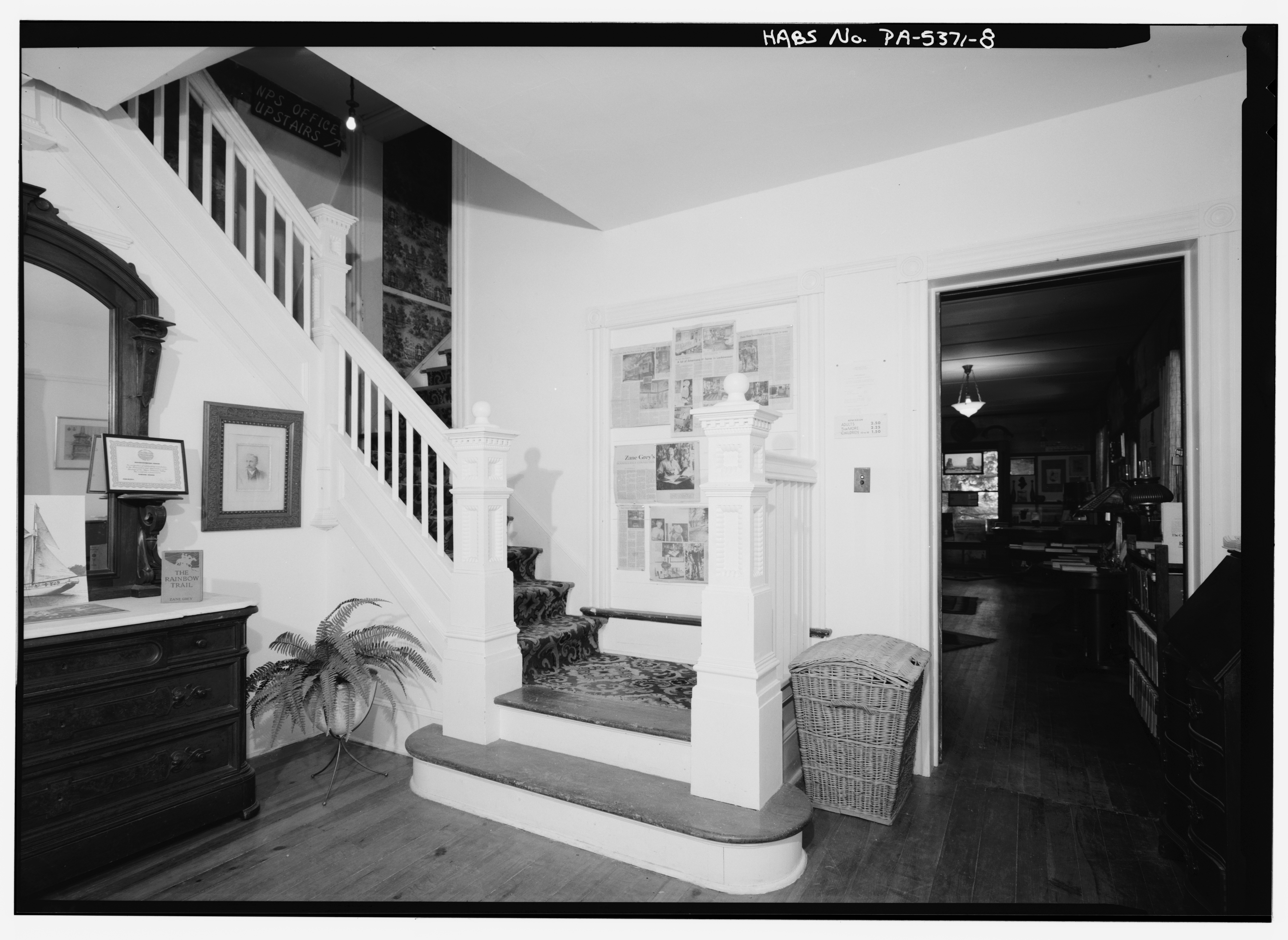
First floor, entrance foyer

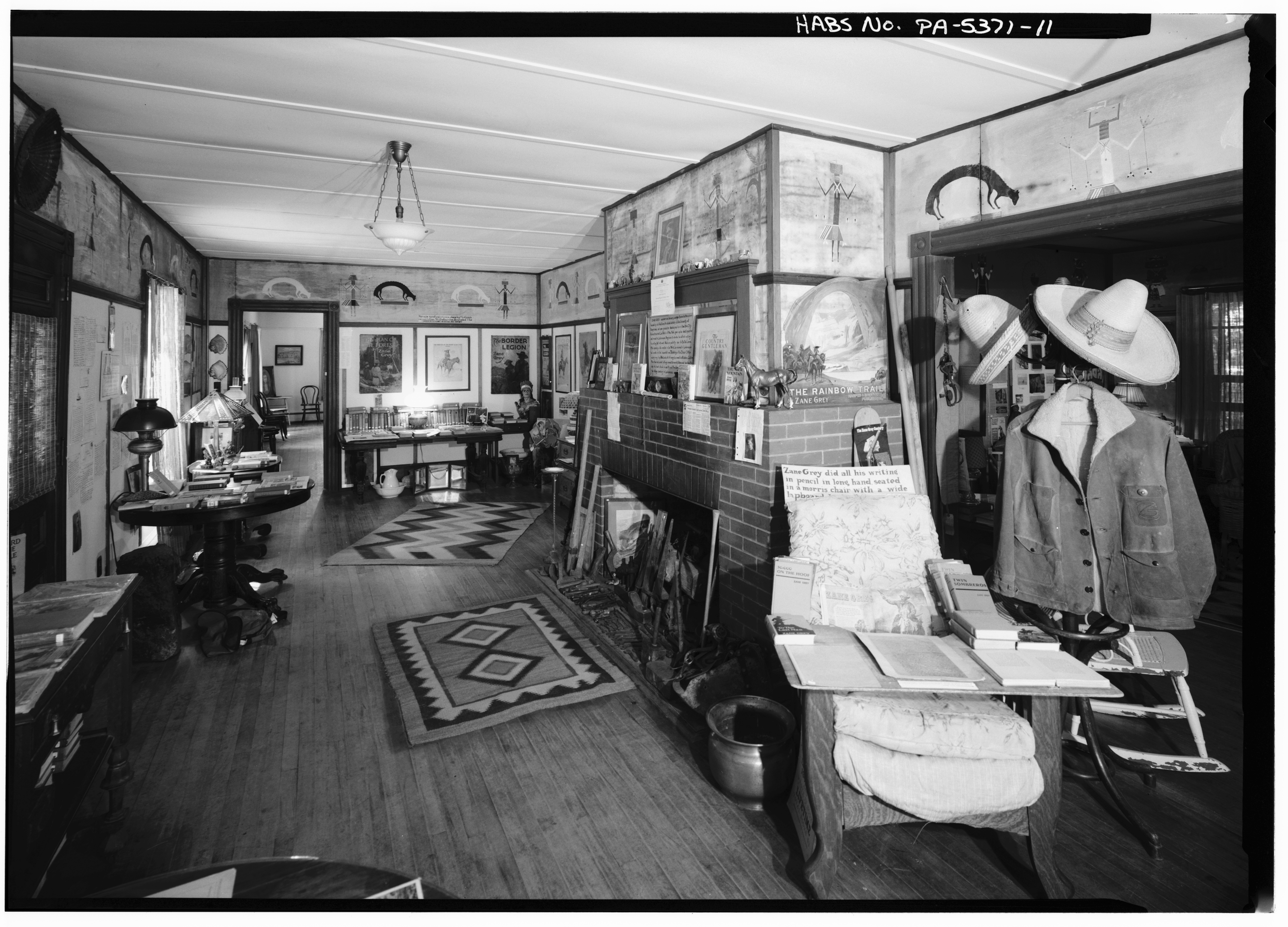
First floor, study (facing south)

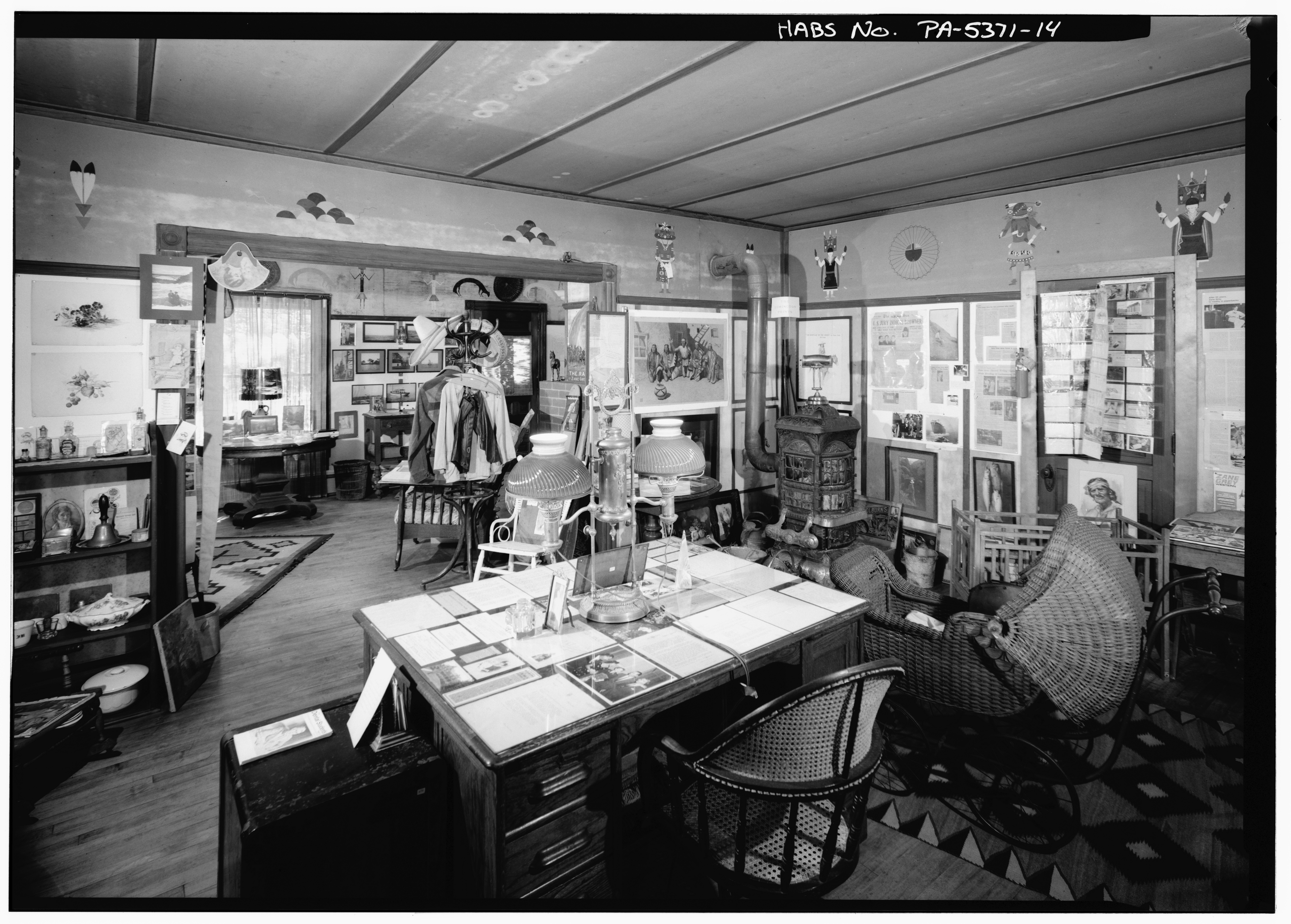
First floor, study (facing southeast)

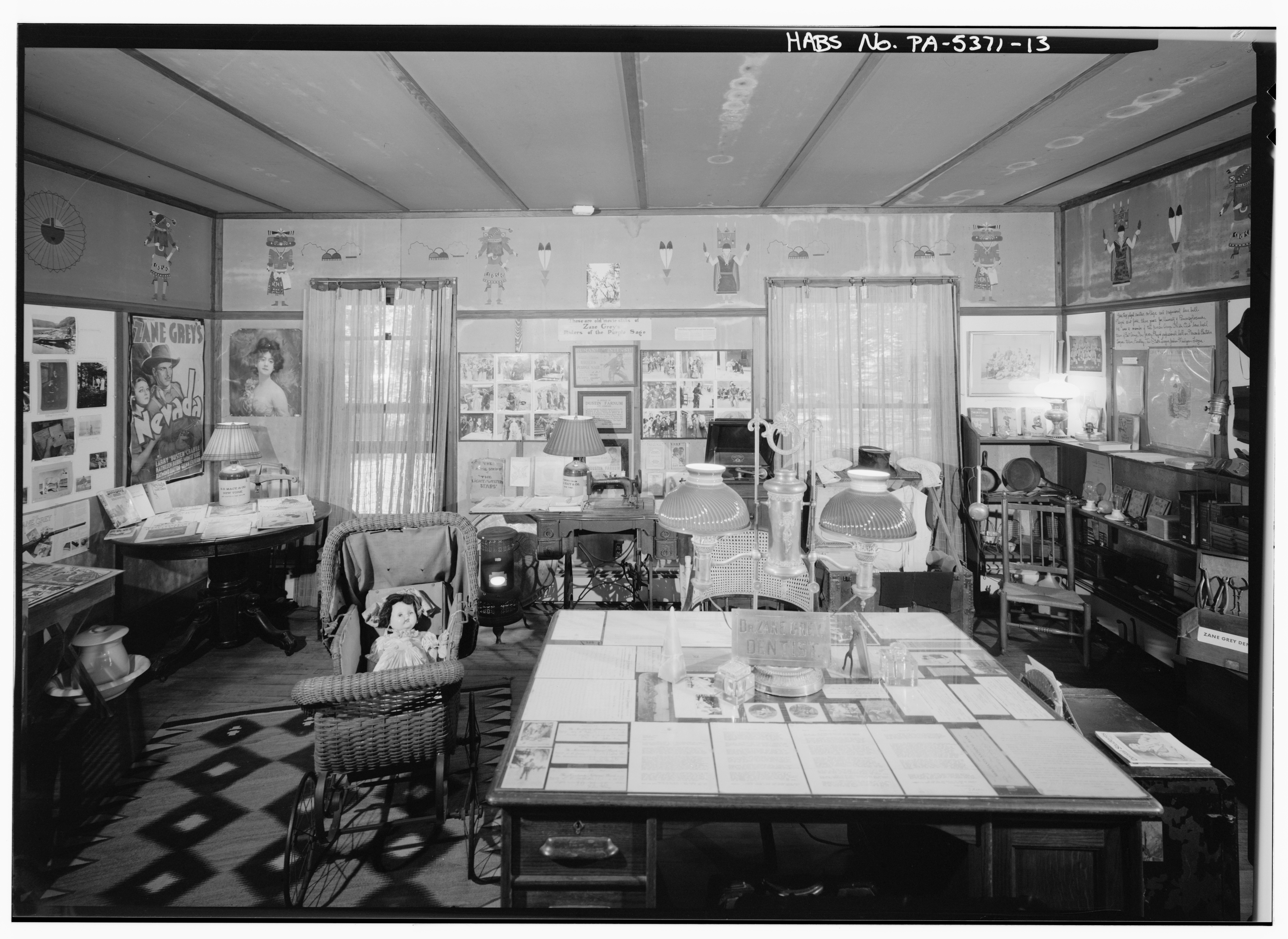
First floor, study (facing west)

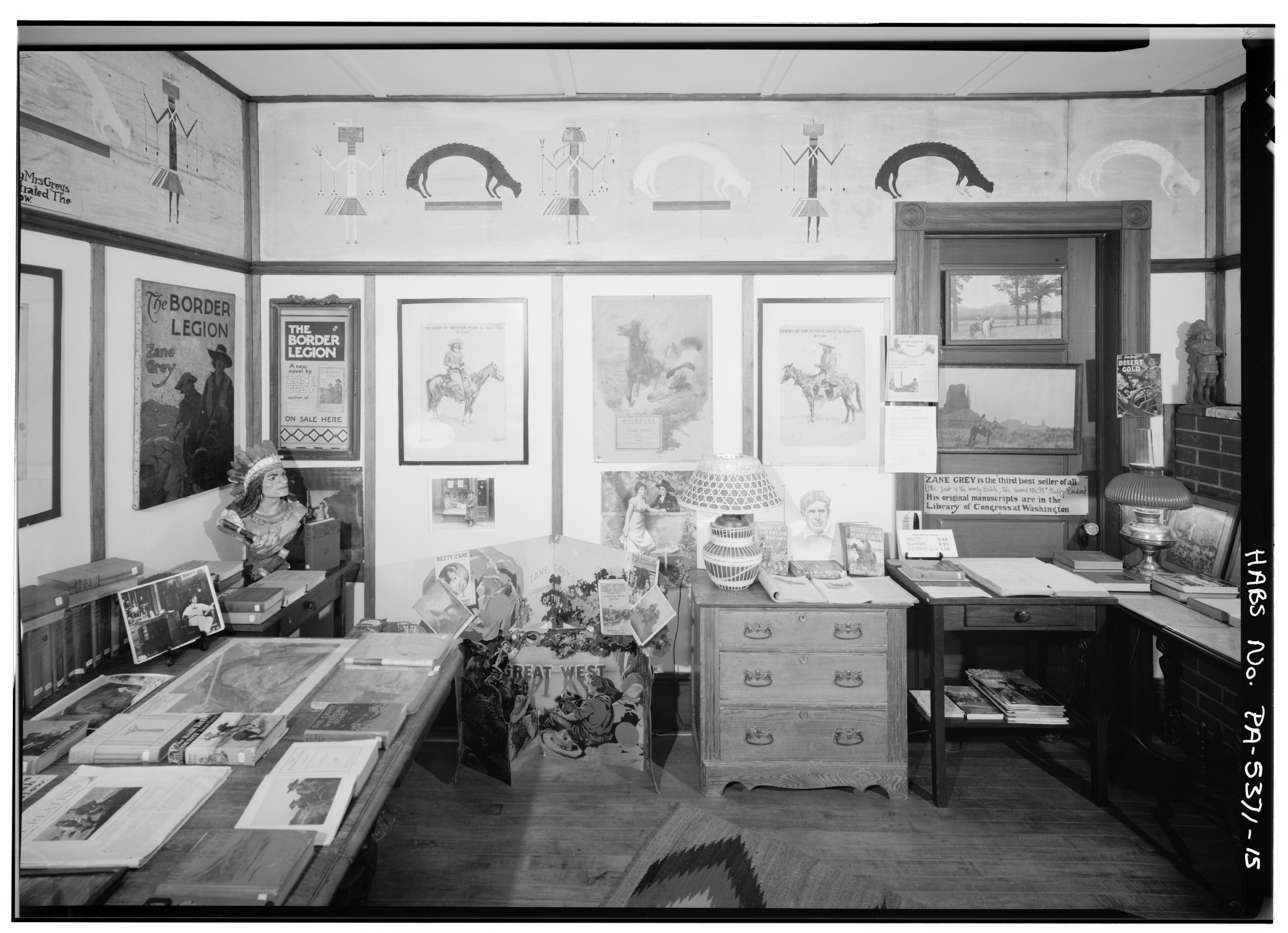
First floor, study (facing northeast)

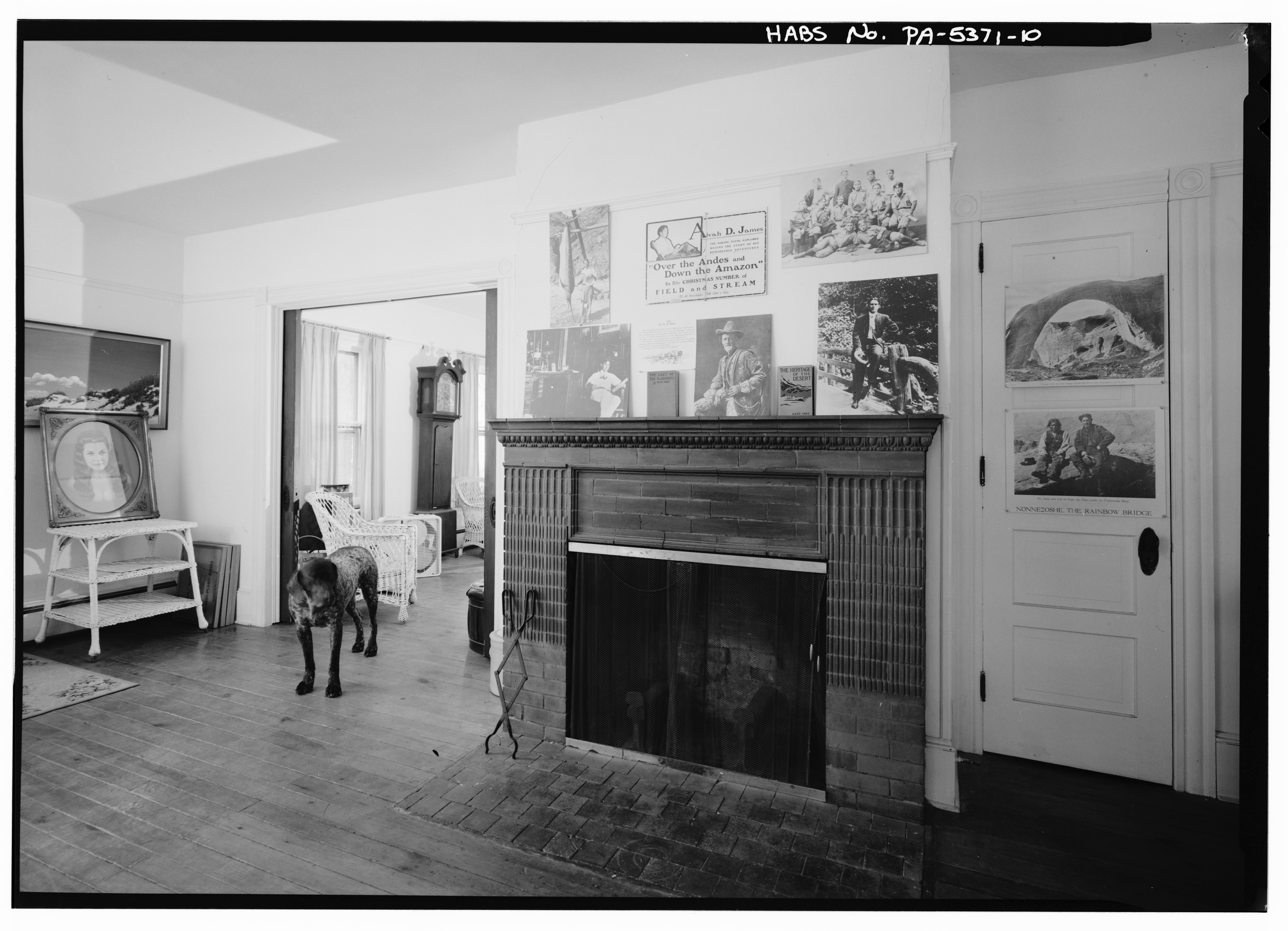
First floor, front parlor

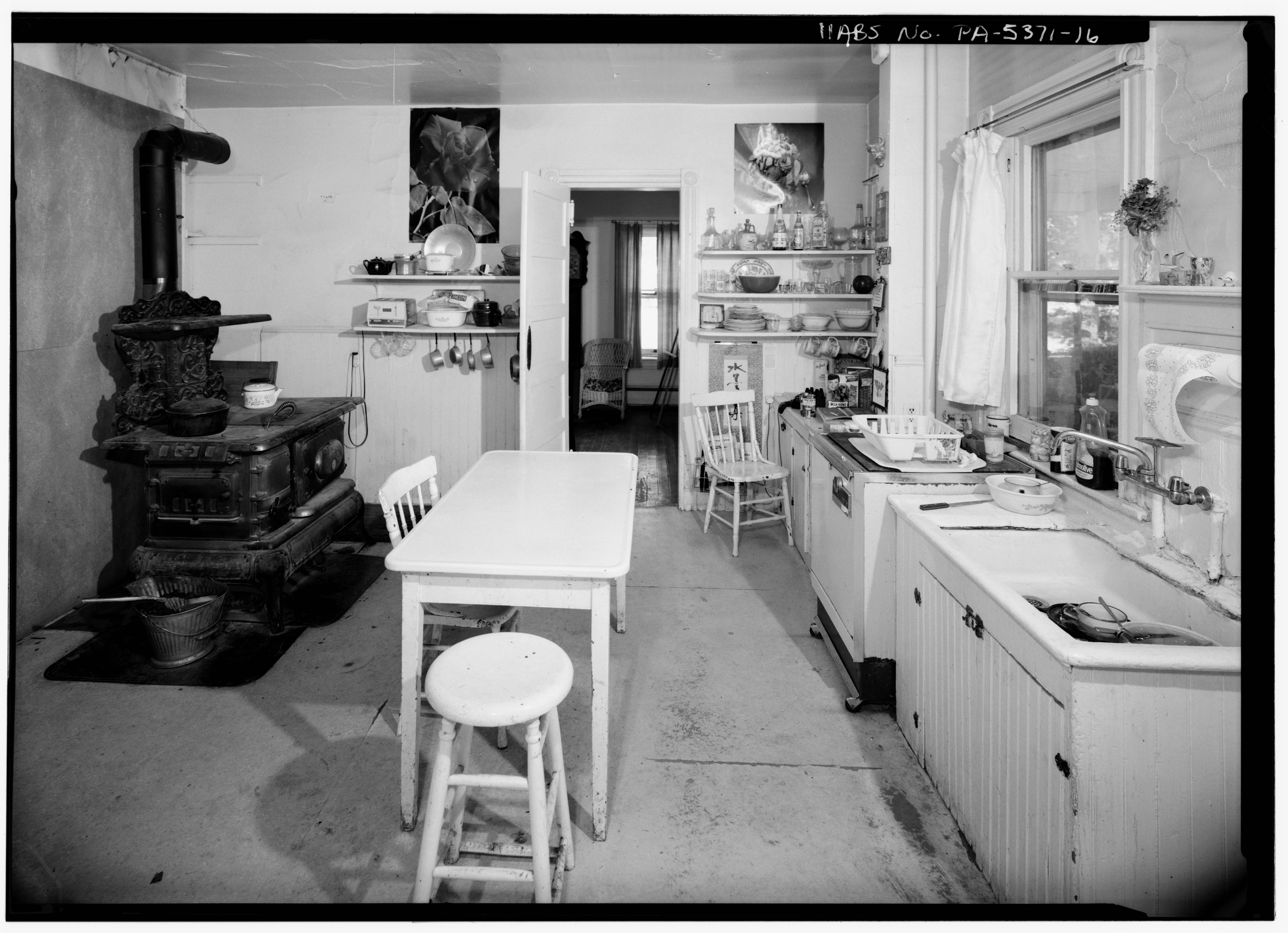
First floor, kitchen

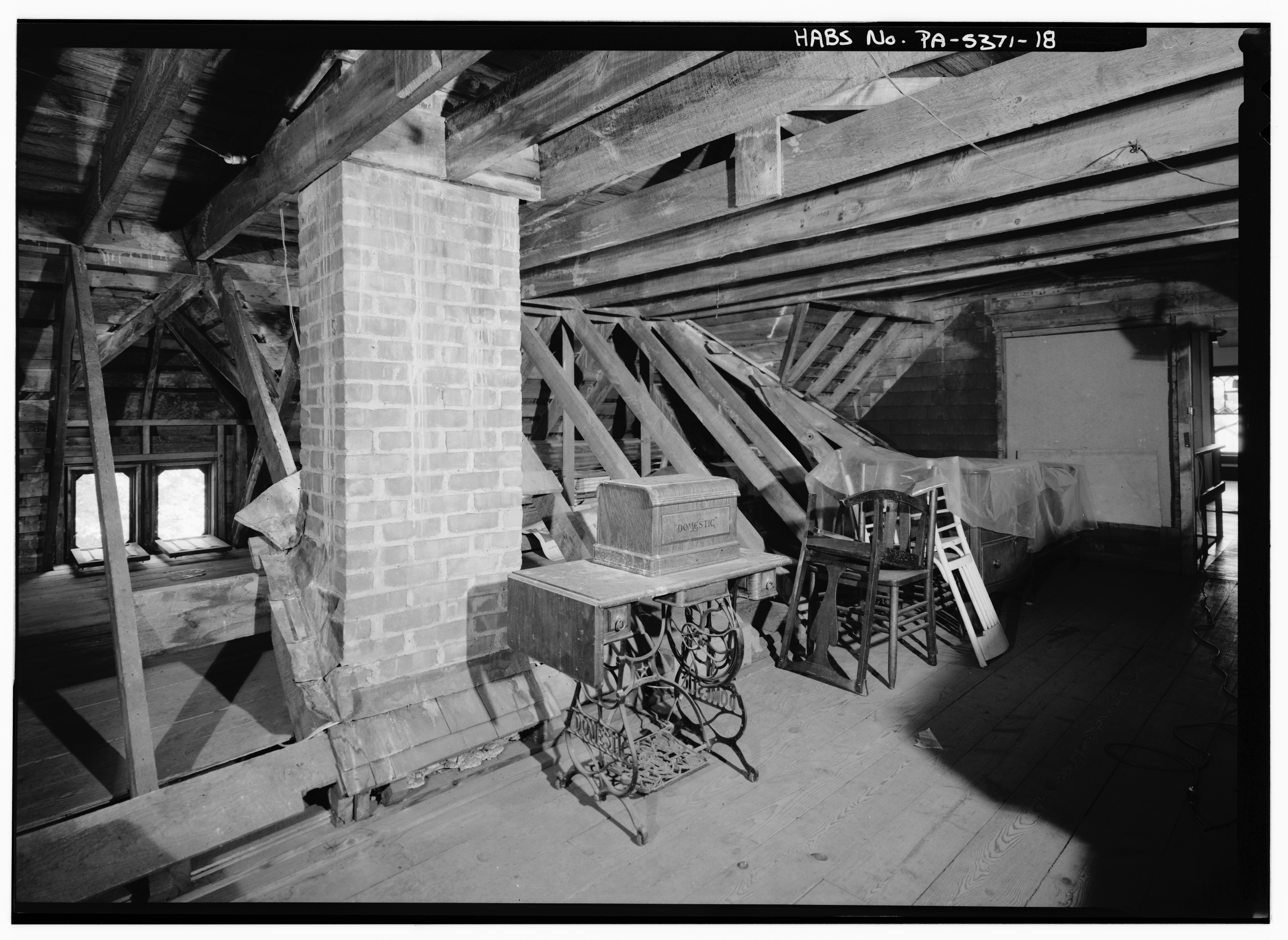
Attic

== See also ==
- National Register of Historic Places listings in Pike County, Pennsylvania
- Upper Delaware Scenic and Recreational River
- Zane Grey Estate
- Zane Grey Cabin
