= Zane Grey Cabin =

- U.S. National Register of Historic Places
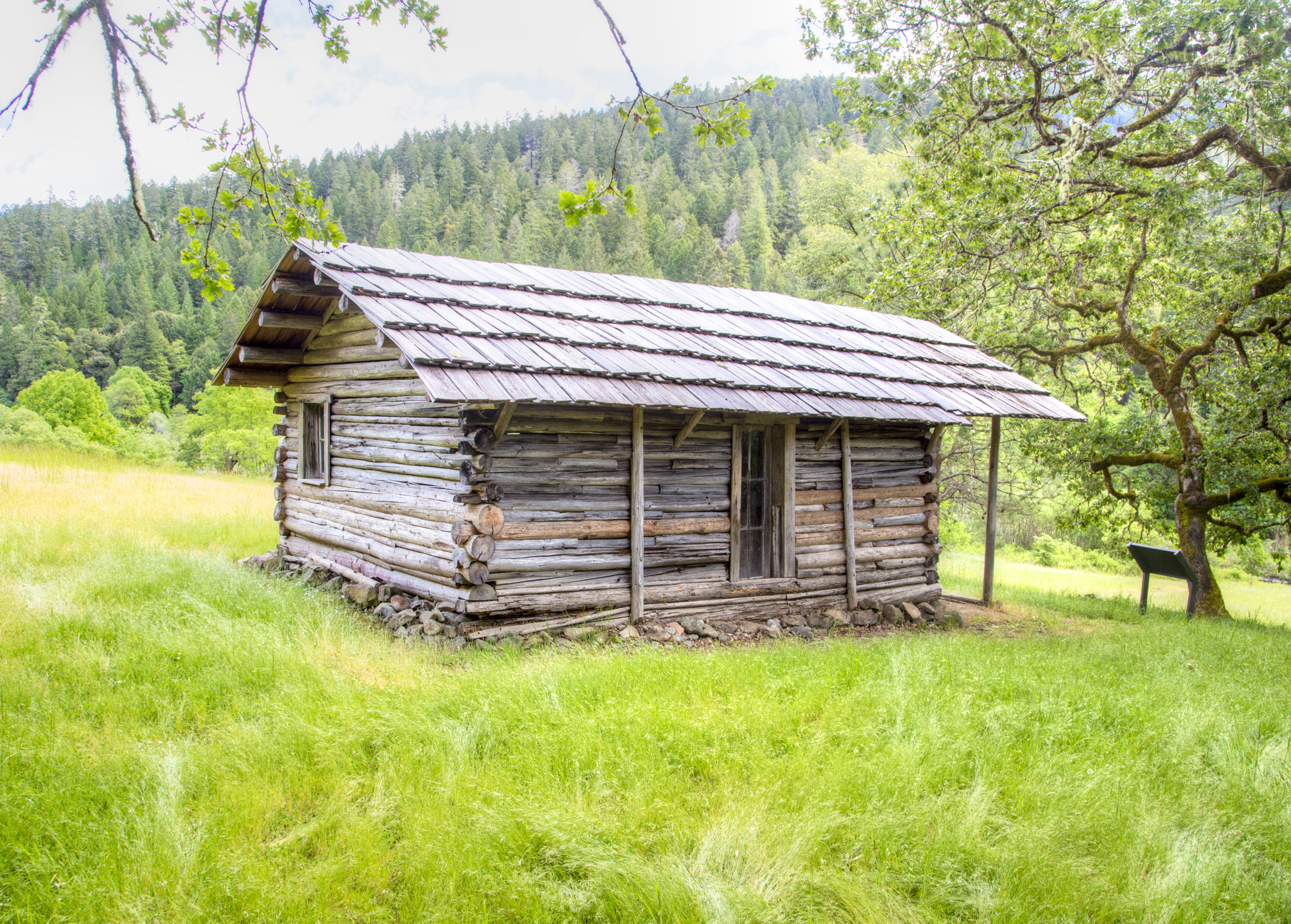

- Location within Oregon Location within the United States
- Location: North bank of the Rogue River near Galice, Oregon
- Coordinates: 42.70187°N 123.80469°W
- NRHP reference No.: 16000413
- Added to NRHP: June 28, 2016

The Zane Grey Cabin near Rogue River in Oregon is a cabin built in 1926 by Zane Grey (1872–1939), the master author of the American West. Grey used it as a frequent retreat until 1935.

It is located in Curry County, Oregon on the north bank of the lower Rogue River near Galice in Josephine County, Oregon.

The National Register announcement of listing for the Zane Grey Cabin incorrectly states that it is located in Josephine County. The cabin is in fact in Curry County.

Zane Grey also had a cabin under the Mogollon Rim near Payson, Arizona. There is a replica of that cabin at the Rim Country Museum.

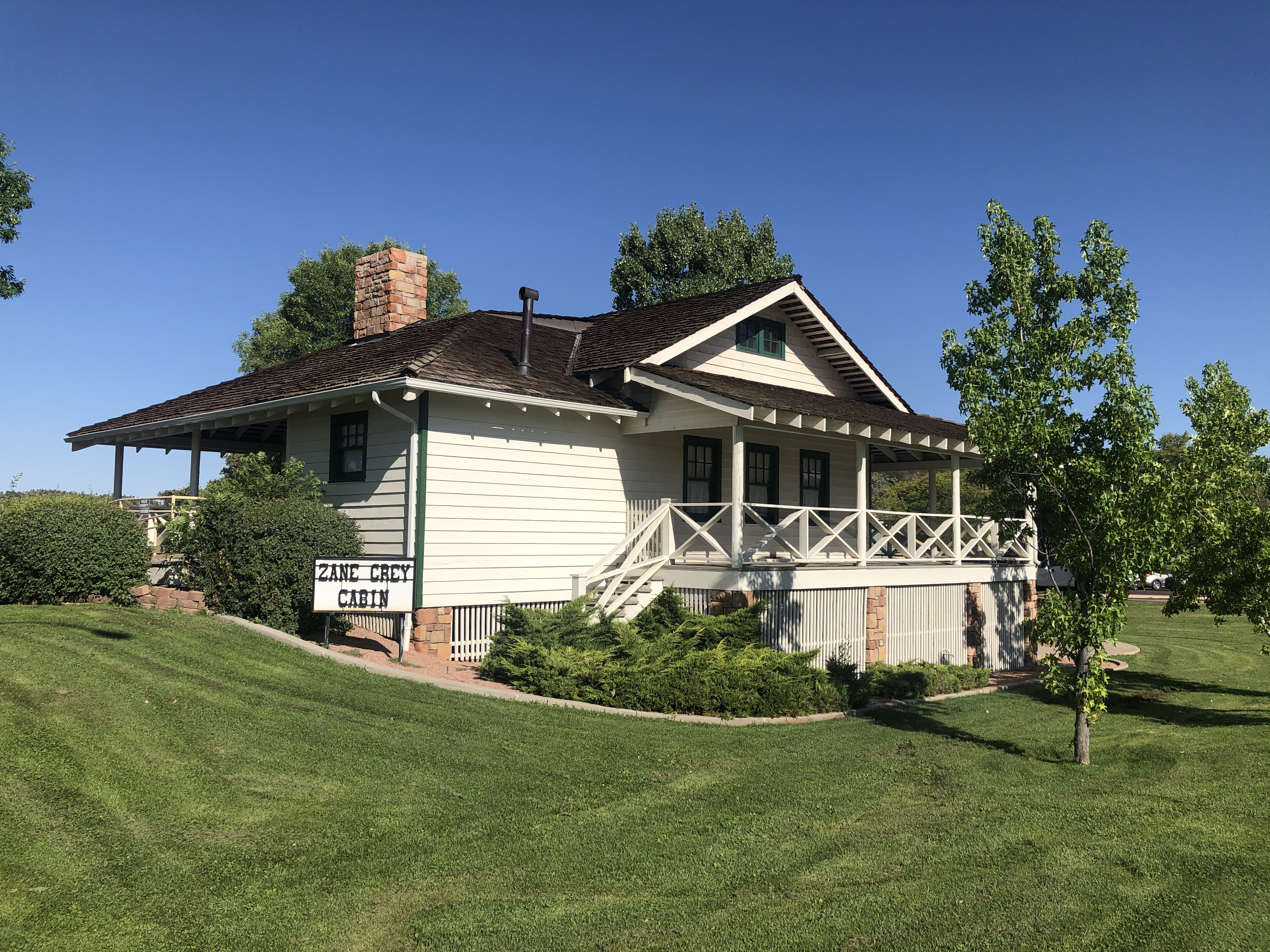
Zane Grey Cabin replica at the Rim Country Museum in Payson, Arizona

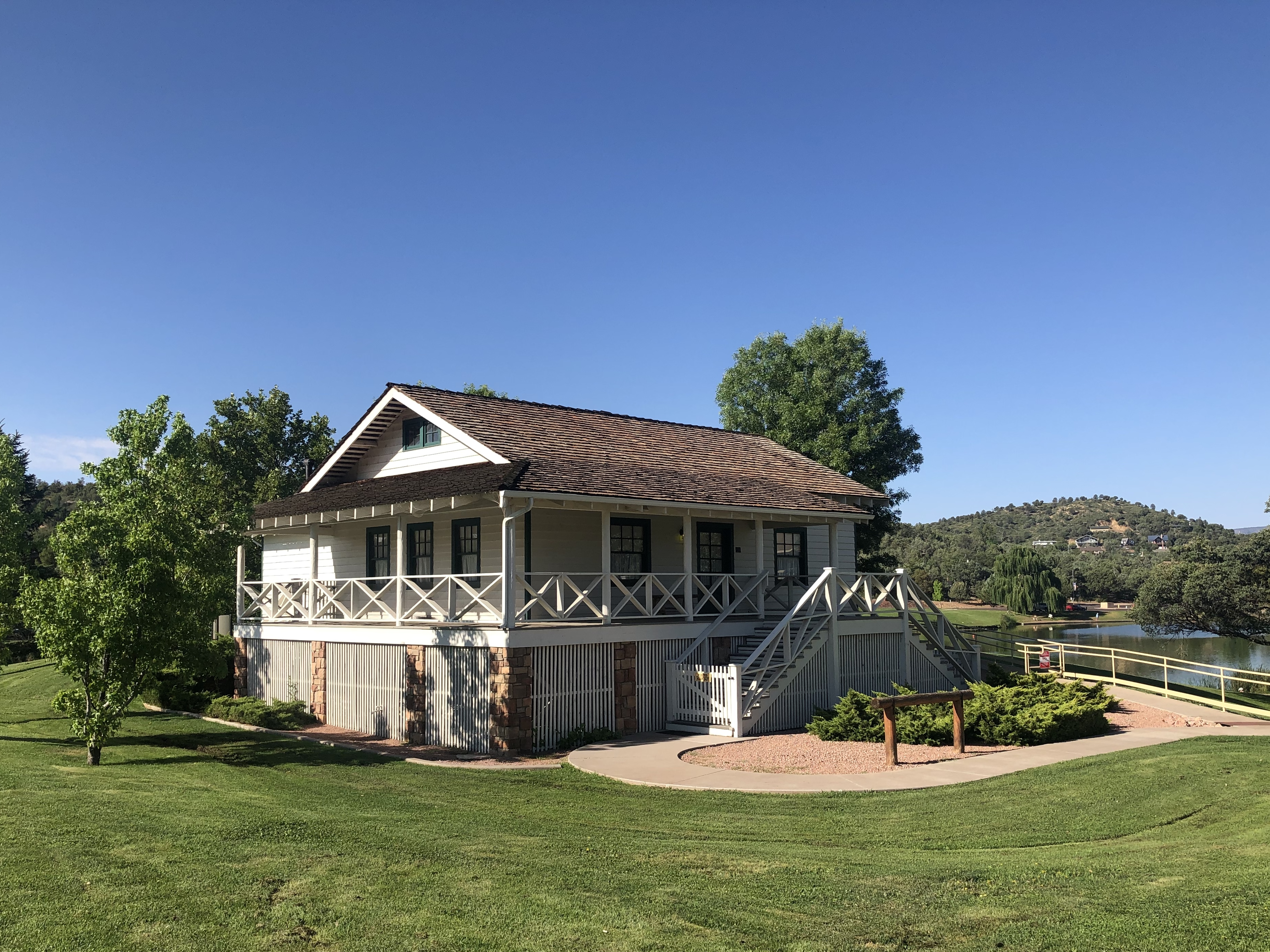
Zane Grey Cabin Replica Payson, Arizona. Zane Grey had a cabin under the Mogollon Rim near Payson.

== See also ==
- Zane Grey Estate, NRHP-listed in Altadena, California
- Zane Grey Museum
- List of residences of American writers
