= Skinners Falls–Milanville Bridge =

Bridge in New York, 1902–2025

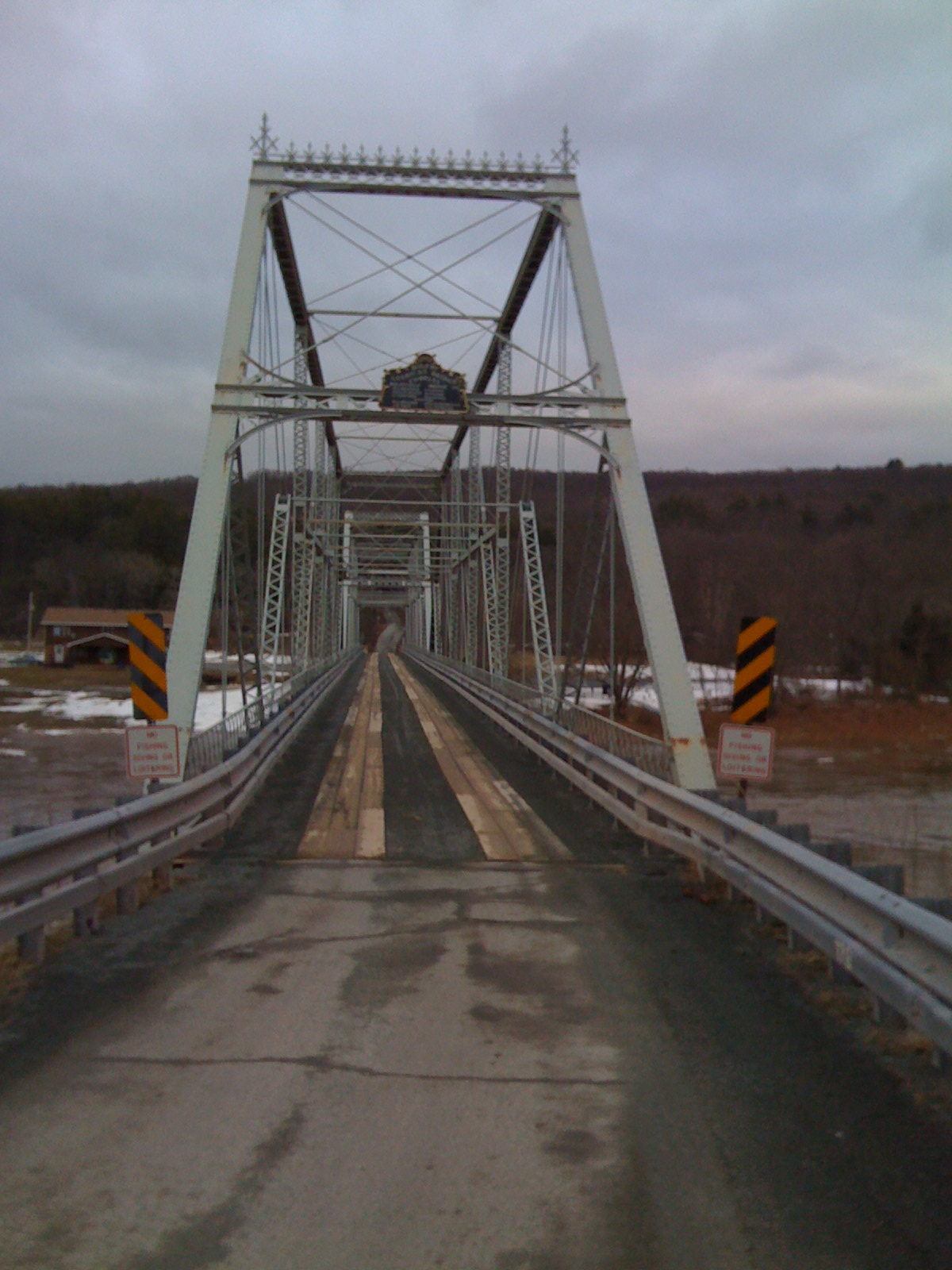
- The Skinners Falls–Milanville Bridge from the Milanville side of the river in March 2009.
- Coordinates: 41.669626°N 75.058358°W
- Carried: Skinners Falls Road (New York); Calkins Road (SR 1002; Pennsylvania)
- Crossed: Delaware River
- Locale: Milanville, Pennsylvania and Cochecton, New York
- Official name: Skinners Falls–Milanville Bridge
- Owner: New York–Pennsylvania Joint Interstate Bridge Commission
- Maintained by: New York–Pennsylvania Joint Interstate Bridge Commission

Characteristics
- Design: Baltimore truss
- Total length: 466.5 feet (142.2 m)
- Longest span: 232.0 feet (70.7 m)
- No. of spans: Two
- Piers in water: 1
- Clearance above: 16 feet (4.9 m) (bridge); 8.5 feet (2.6 m) (overhead bars)

History
- Designer: American Bridge Company
- Construction start: 1901
- Construction end: November 1902
- Opened: 1902
- Closed: 2010–2013, 2015–2016, 2018, 2019–2025
- Demolished: April 17, 2025–April 21, 2025

Statistics
- Toll: $0.22 (at opening) $0.25 (upon elimination of tolls)

Location
- Interactive map of Skinners Falls–Milanville Bridge

The Skinners Falls–Milanville Bridge was a bridge spanning the Delaware River between Milanville, Damascus Township, Pennsylvania and the hamlet of Skinners Falls in Cochecton, New York from 1902 to 2025. The 466.5-foot (142.2 m) long Baltimore truss bridge carried traffic of Calkins Road (State Route 1002) in Milanville and Skinners Falls Road in Cochecton over a single wooden lane of traffic until its final closure in October 2019. The bridge was one of two bridges on the National Register of Historic Places along the river in Sullivan County (the other being Roebling's Delaware Aqueduct), and was a contributing member of the Milanville Historic District.

Replacing a ferry run by descendants of the Skinner family, the Milanville Bridge Company came into existence in May 1901 to establish a new bridge between the two communities. After facing local opposition from competing bridges along the river, the bridge, built by the American Bridge Company of New York City, opened in November 1902. A flood in late March 1904 wiped out the New York span of the bridge, requiring reconstruction of the span. The New York–Pennsylvania Joint Interstate Bridge Commission bought the bridge in April 1923, eliminating the Milanville Bridge Company and tolls on the bridge.

The bridge in its later years struggled to stay together as it aged. After several attempts to repair the bridge through closings and repairs, the Pennsylvania Department of Transportation (PennDOT) closed the bridge for good on October 16, 2019 after finding parts of the bridge deteriorating. Despite multiple attempts to consider restoration of the old bridge, a metal brace fell into the river in 2024, resulting in the necessity of removing the structure from the river. Initial hopes were to dismantle the bridge and restore it offsite, but on December 17, 2024 PennDOT announced that the bridge would be demolished entirely due to the main failure and the lack of expectation that it would survive the dismantling project. Demolition of the bridge began exactly five months later on April 17, 2025 and the bridge ceased to exist on April 21. The bridge was in service for nearly 117 years when it was closed in 2019.

As of the bridge's removal, there is no longer any bridge at this location. The closest Delaware River crossings are now the Cochecton–Damascus Bridge to the north and the Narrowsburg–Darbytown Bridge to the south.

== Design ==
The Skinners Falls–Milanville Bridge was a 466.5-foot (142.2 m) steel truss bridge with two 232-foot (71 m) spans. A form of a Baltimore truss, the bridge contained a 2-by-4-inch (0.051 m × 0.102 m) wooden deck with steel stringers that supported the deck. The single lane along the span is 13.41 feet (4.09 m) wide and has a vertical clearance of 15.75 feet (4.80 m). However, in order to restrict traffic before the closure of the bridge, there were 8.5-foot (2.6 m) clearance bars placed on each side of the bridge. These helped prevent overweight vehicles from crossing the structure.

== Early history and construction (1764–1902) ==
In 1764, the crossing from Skinners Falls to Milanville was the location of timber rafting for one of the most prominent families in the area, the Skinners. That year, Daniel Skinner took the first timber raft down the Delaware River. Completing this accomplishment, Skinner received the name "Lord High Admiral", an honor that still stands to this date. The Skinners lived in a place christened as Milanville, but was known more locally as Skinners Falls. Upstream from the falls along the Delaware, another member of the Skinner family, Milton L. Skinner, operated a private ferry across the river between Pennsylvania and New York. Along with his brother, Volney, Milton Skinner also operated a local sawmill in Pennsylvania. For many years, these two rivermen remained prominent in the area.

Money for the construction of a new bridge over the Delaware River came in March 1899. At that time, Milanville was selected a crossing due to being a location for the convergence of nine local roads and it would serve as a way to have tourists into Wayne County. At the time, early speculation said that the bridge could be open by autumn of 1899.

However, it would not be until May 1901 that the Pennsylvania Legislature would approve a bill to incorporate the Milanville Bridge Company, a firm run by Milton Skinner and other shareholders to maintain a bridge between Milanville and the then-hamlet of Skinner's Switch, New York. The stock required for construction would be $15,000 with room to expand to $18,000 if required by the company. The charter also stated that the bridge would have to be at least 14 feet (4.3 m) between th side railings and have a wooden deck no less than 3 inches (76 mm) thick. Piers would have to be built where it would not affect the navigational channel for the Delaware River watercraft to use. The charter stated that the new bridge would have to be built by May 1906.

The Milanville Bridge Company acquired $10,000 of the $15,000 required by the middle of July 1901. In late August 1901, the company awarded a construction contract to the American Bridge Company of New York City. Construction was underway by November 1901, and initial hope was for an opening in early 1902. Stone for the new abutments and piers arrived by December. The stone came from a local quarry. With the new bridge, locals surmised that the area around Skinner's Switch would grow massively from the construction of the new bridge and access to Milanville. The Erie Railroad would build a new milk station at Skinner's and thoughts were the railroad might build a new passenger station as well. There was also proposal of building a road from Lake Huntington. However, weather caused construction of the bridge to stop in January 1902.

Local opposition came during this period from the owners of the nearby Narrowsburg–Darbytown Bridge (to the south) and the Cochecton–Damascus Bridge (to the north). John Anderson, representing the Cochecton–Damascus Bridge ownership, took a trip to Albany, New York to voice his opposition to the new bridge, citing unnecessary competition. Both sides (Anderson and the Milanville Bridge Company) came to an agreement that the bridge's single-lane design would result in limited use in comparison to the two surrounding bridges, which were both wider and multiple lanes for ease of traffic. The bridge opened in November 1902, with a complete cost of $14,000.

== Private ownership (1902–1923) ==
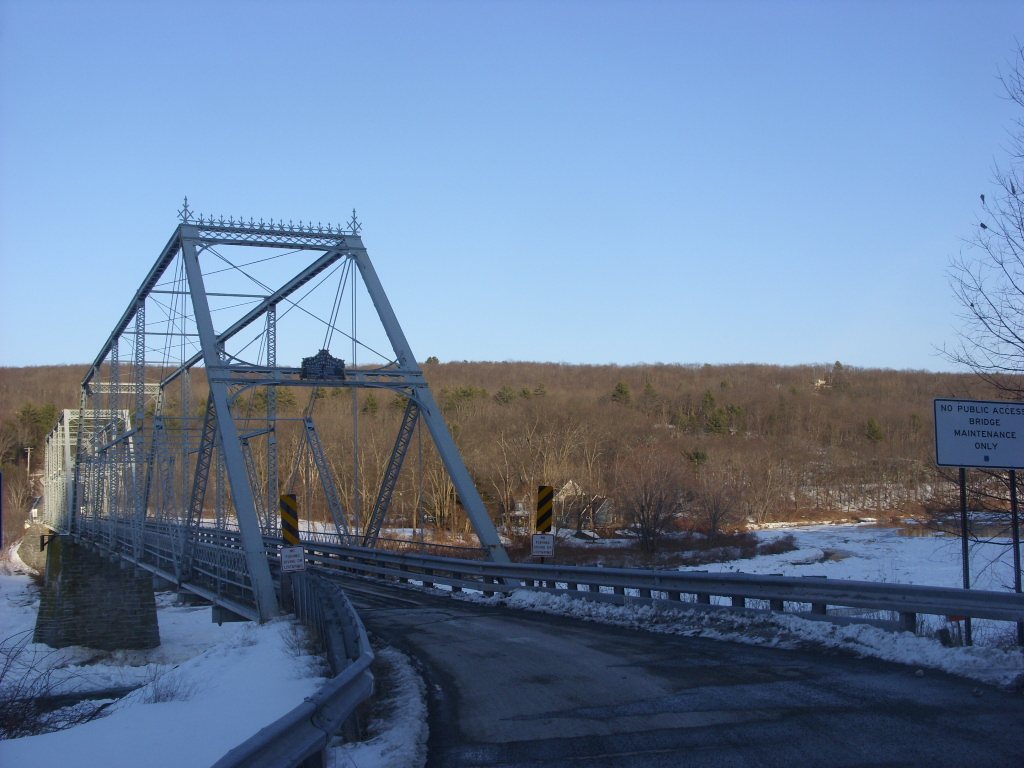
Approaching the Skinners Falls–Milanville Bridge with Delaware River in view

After construction of the Skinners Falls–Milanville Bridge was completed in late 1902, tolls were immediately charged along the one lane structure. However, unlike the other two bridges, the Skinners Falls–Milanville Bridge cost $0.22 (1902 USD, equal to $8.19 today). A person traveling on foot did not have to pay to cross the structure. This decision was different compared to the other bridges, which made it separate. Another decision was that ministers were not tolled so they could better serve their communities. However, when one minister began to abuse the special privilege, he was charged $0.05 for crossing. The tollhouse for collection was in Milanville and was run by the Dexter family.

Ice caused a massive flood along the Delaware River on the night of March 27, 1904. During that flood, the river reached 6–8 feet (1.8–2.4 m) higher than normal and flooded much of the valley around the town of Cochecton. Flooding and ice blocks caused damage to houses, barns and other structures in the area. Along with the Callicoon Bridge, built two years prior after another flood, the Skinners Falls–Milanville Bridge had a section washed away in the flooding. Believed to have been caused by the failure of one of its piers, the New York span of the bridge floated down the river for 0.75-mile (1.21 km) along with the failed pier and one of the abutments, to a spot where it stopped moving. The rest of the bridge remained intact from the flooding. The Milanville Bridge Company offered up new bonds to pay for the repairs and in June 1904, the Owego Bridge Company took a contract to repair the bridge and construction began quickly. Later investigation found that the piers on the bridge were not properly anchored and the movement of the piers resulted in the destruction of the New York span of the bridge. As part of the reconstruction effort, the bridge span would be taken to the company's factory and have the truss straightened after the flood caused damage to the ironwork. After the reconstruction, the bridge span would be brought back to the site and anchored on the new piers. The expectation at the time was the repaired structure would be opened by September 1, 1904. The bridge repairs would cost $7,000 (1904 USD, equal to $250833.33 today) and reopened in November 1904.

With the reopening of the bridge, and along with the newly constructed Erie Railroad station, a new revitalization came to Skinners Falls and Milanville, including an acid company, creamery, and a dairy company, which helped raise income for the bridge using the $0.22 toll. One company that could not make it is the Skinners' timber rafting, which had been in business for over 140 years. In 1914, J. Skinner was the new owner, but the company was devastated when one of their timber rafts collided with a Myers family-owned ferryboat, killing four. The blame was placed on the ferry operator. However, along with the tragedy, the lack of riverside forests made it hard for timber rafting to prosper and in 1914, they closed their doors.

== Bridge Commission ownership (1923–2024) ==
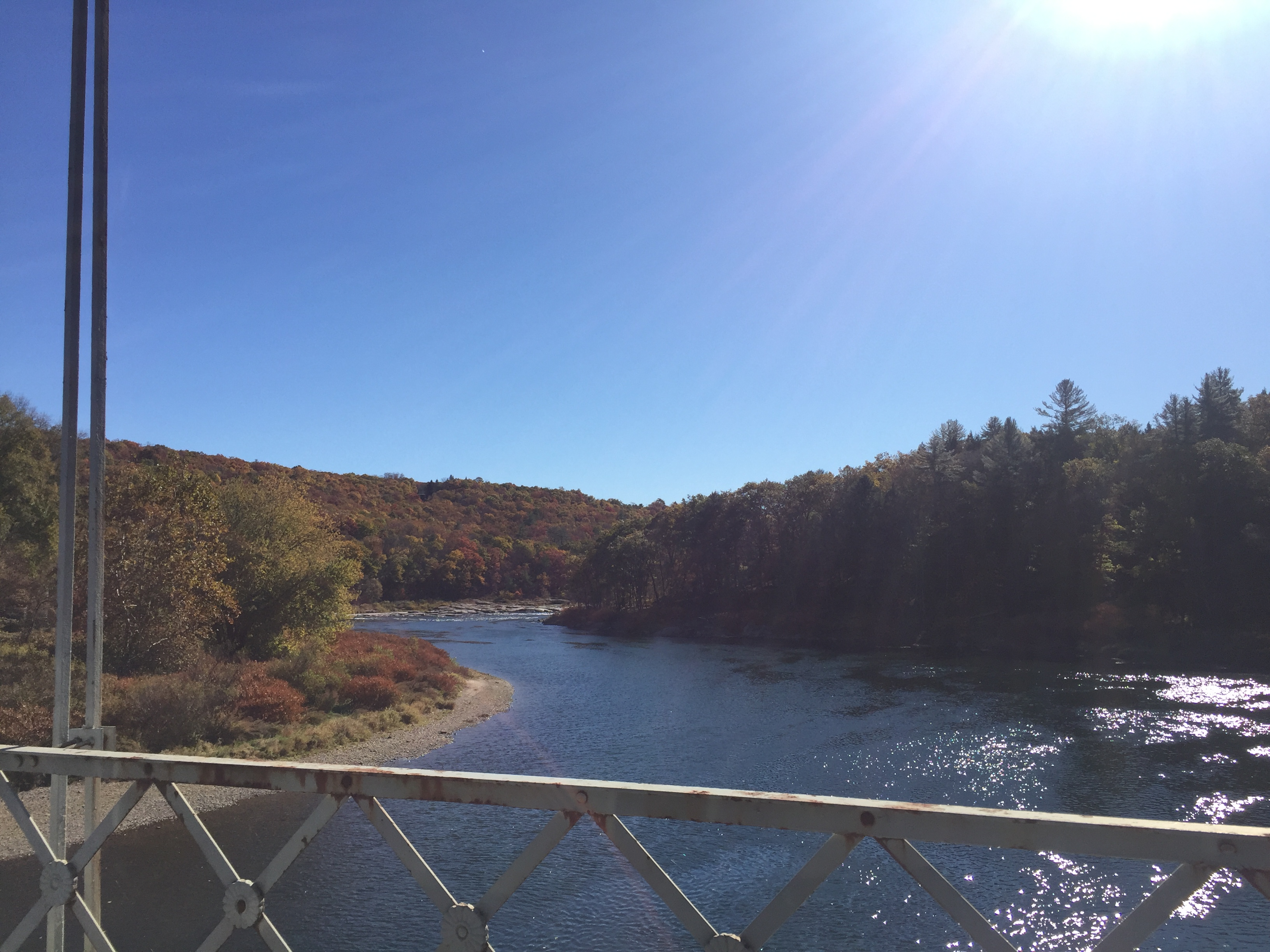
A view of the Delaware River toward the south from the bridge

With the opening of the New York–Pennsylvania Joint Bridge Commission in the 1920s to buy out these bridges from private ownership, the tolls along the bridges of the Delaware were beginning to come to an end. News broke in mid-April 1923 that the New York–Pennsylvania Joint Bridge Commission had purchased the Skinners Falls–Milanville Bridge for $19,005. Homer Greene, the attorney for the Joint Commission, along with E. A. Lamb, Secretary of Engineers for the Joint Commission, represented the government while Milton Skinner and L. J. Hocker of the Milanville Bridge Company represented their company. It marked the third bridge in recent months to have its toll eliminated, following the Callicoon Bridge and the Cochecton–Damascus Bridge.

With the new owners, the bridge was kept under routine maintenance, and the bridge has continued to maintain a strong structure. Even with the floods from Hurricanes Connie and Diane of 1955 and the 1960s, the bridge survived with little to no structural damage. From May to October 1986, the commission closed the bridge to do some renovations. The wooden deck was replaced, the entire bridge was painted, and new guide rails were constructed. The 3 ton (6000 lb) weight limit remained after the revamping. On November 14, 1988, the bridge was added to the National Register of Historic Places. The Register determined that it was a rare multiple-span Baltimore truss still intact in the country, along with the fact that its location on the Delaware River helped keep its unique historical look. Other factors included the decorative railings and ornaments that were on the ironwork, unusual compared to most Baltimore trusses. The bridge also became part of the Milanville Historic District in 1993.

=== Bridge cracks and deck problems (1991–1994) ===
In April 1991, PennDOT and the New York State Department of Transportation (NYSDOT) doing inspection of the ten Bridge Commission bridges, found a crack in the abutment on the Pennsylvania side of the river. This crack was visible in both the stonework and the mortar of the abutment. PennDOT stated that they would continue to monitor the bridge but that the bridge would need emergency work if the crack worsened. If that scenario occurred, a plan would be made to repair the crack in the autumn of 1991 to avoid interference with the tourists in the Delaware River valley. However, the crack on the Pennsylvania side never expanded after continued PennDOT monitoring through May 1993. Two years after the Pennsylvania crack appeared, PennDOT engineers found a crack on the New York side of the river on that abutment and they would check on that crack every three months. At that time, PennDOT would also install new nails into the wooden deck of the bridge and continue monitor of all cracks.

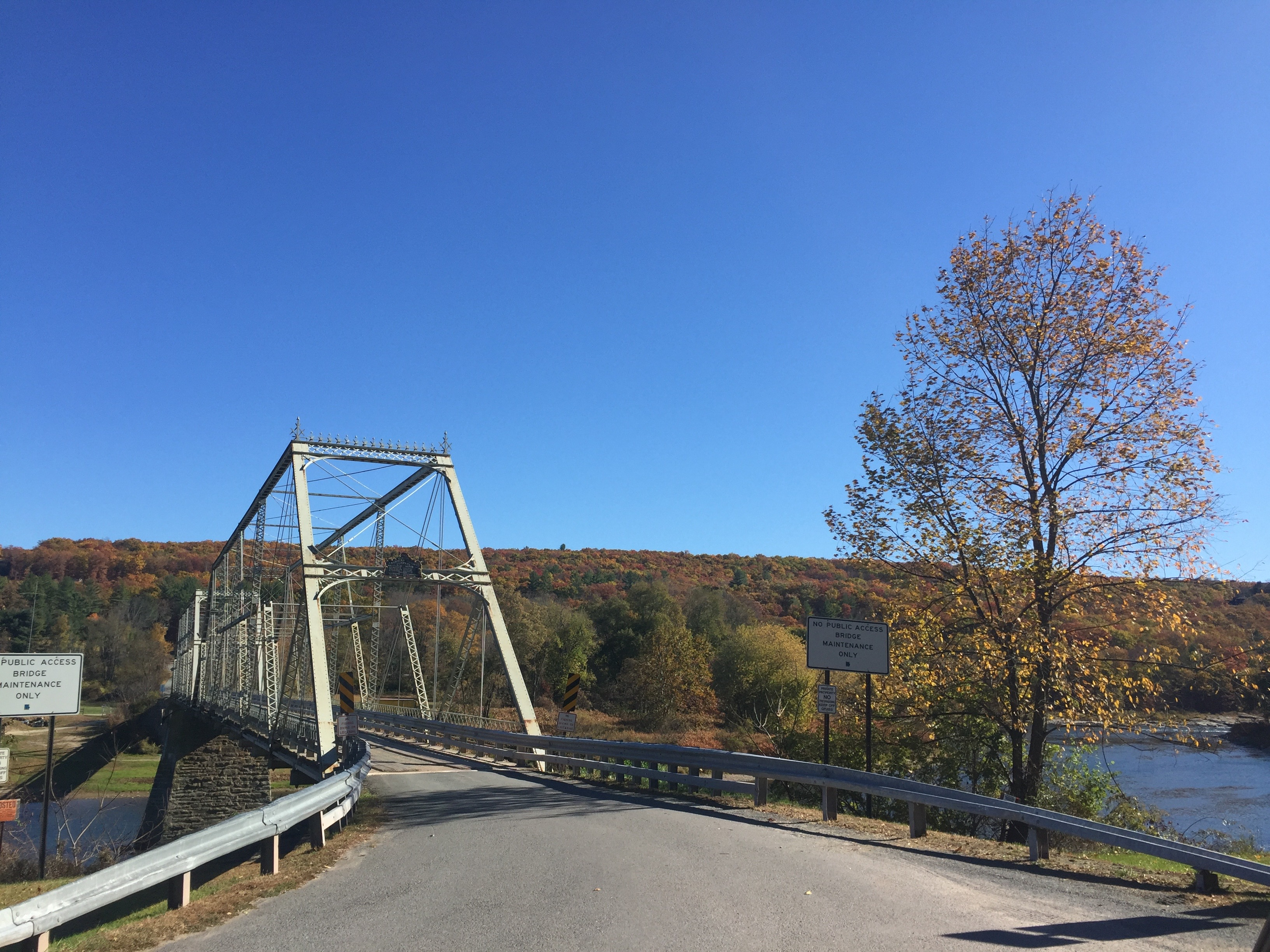
A view of the bridge in October 2015, with the signs closing it to public traffic

However, a year later, the nail project failed to deal with the noise level coming from the bridge's deck. The PennDOT test experiment of 25 feet (7.6 m) of new nails did not stop noise and other places had loose enough board to make a lot of noise under vehicles. That, along with being in a steep valley, caused noise from the bridge to be louder than normal. PennDOT stated in May 1994 that they would try a different nailing tactic to prevent the bridge noise, installing them at an angle rather than straight down to attempt to keep to boards on the deck in place. At the same time, PennDOT also stated that they believe the bearings in the bridge were frozen, leading to the cracks in the New York side's abutment. They speculated that it would either the bearings would have to be replaced or the whole bridge would have to be raised from its current elevation.

=== Repeated bridge closures ===
PennDOT worked on the bridge on multiple occasions to perform emergency repairs to the structure during the 2010s, beginning in 2010. The 2010 repairs included repairing the portal members that were part of a failing truss member, resulting in the bridge's closure that January. Two years later, eyebar hangers that were deteriorating were replaced new threaded rods. However, the 2013 repairs were far more serious, requiring metal braces on the bridge's stringers, of which 43 were replaced themselves. The floor beams were repaired and strengthened as well. However, PennDOT shut the bridge down on December 15, 2015, stating the stringers that were replaced, fell out of alignment and work would need to be done. This work occurred in 2016, with u-bolts, pin caps and trusses being replaced, along with 44 new stringers. During this construction, PennDOT installed new vertical overhead bars to prevent overweight or over height vehicles from using the span.

PennDOT was planning another effort on repairs for the bridge when on a customer complaint in October 2019, engineers inspected the bridge and found sections of the truss structure and its deck deteriorating, forcing the bridge to be closed for the final time on October 16, 2019.

== Demolition (2024–2025) ==
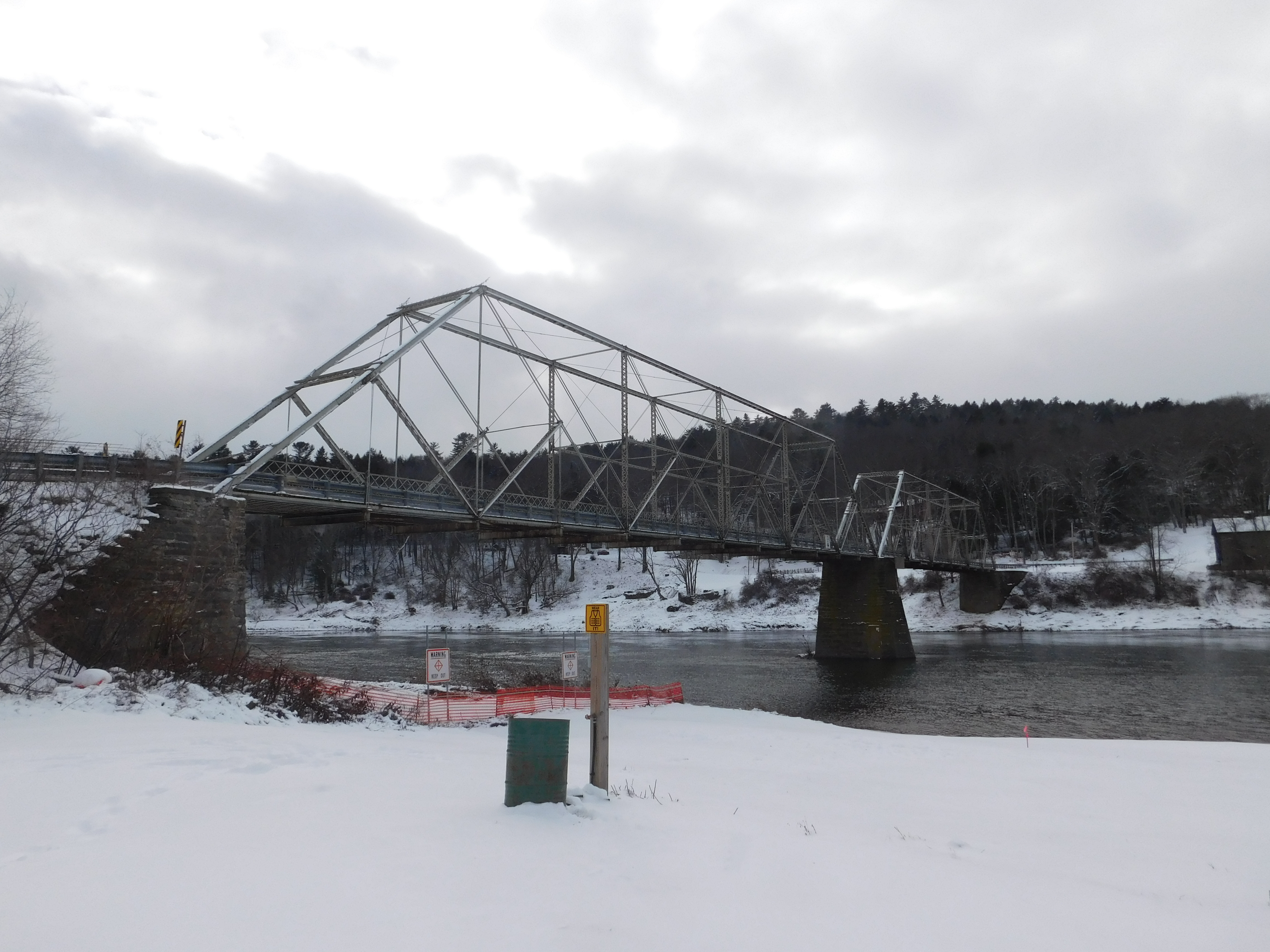
The bridge in December 2024, days after the emergency order for demolition

On November 8, 2024, PennDOT announced that the bridge would be dismantled due to safety concerns for river-goers that would pass under the bridge. A metal brace had come loose under the bridge, resulting in this condition. PennDOT stated they would retain all the parts of the bridge for future use, but there were concerns the bridge would collapse before rehabilitation could be finished. As of November 8, PennDOT had been working on getting all approvals for the dismantling by December 1.

During the week of November 18, 2024, engineers and cultural professionals used drones to do an inspection of the bridge and make their plans for the future. PennDOT stated in their reports that the dismantled pieces of the bridge would be stored at their yard at Waymart, Pennsylvania, where they could be restored on a regular pace. The emergency dismantling also put a pause on their work on plans for the future of the structure. The hope at the time was to have the bridge dismantled by May 1, 2025.

At a meeting on December 16, PennDOT stated that the bridge would be demolished on an emergency basis, stating that the deteriorating condition of the bridge made it likely the bridge would fail when doing a crane lift. Governor Josh Shapiro signed an emergency declaration for demolition of the bridge on December 16. PennDOT District 4 stated that they would have to build a stone causeway through the river to help bring down the bridge through controlled explosives. The change in removal was part of the bridge starting to move unassisted. The planned demolition is set for mid-January 2025, though no official date has been announced.

The Upper Delaware Council stated their disappointment in the unexpected demolition of the bridge. The Council's Executive Director, Laurie Ramie, and Evan Radua, an official with the town of Tusten, accused PennDOT of not maintaining the structure between 2019 and 2024 and that time and money dropped into studies helped lead to the bridge's continued deterioration. Locals announced that a memorial service would be held for the bridge on January 12, 2025 in Damascus Township. The Upper Delaware Council backed PennDOT's analysis in late January 2025. Damascus Citizens for Sustainability and the Wrought Iron Bridge Works (WIBW) both continued their opposition to the demolition of the bridge. WIBW sent a new proposal to PennDOT to work on the bridge by producing falseworks that would reduce the weight load on the abutments and allow for the repair of the abutments.

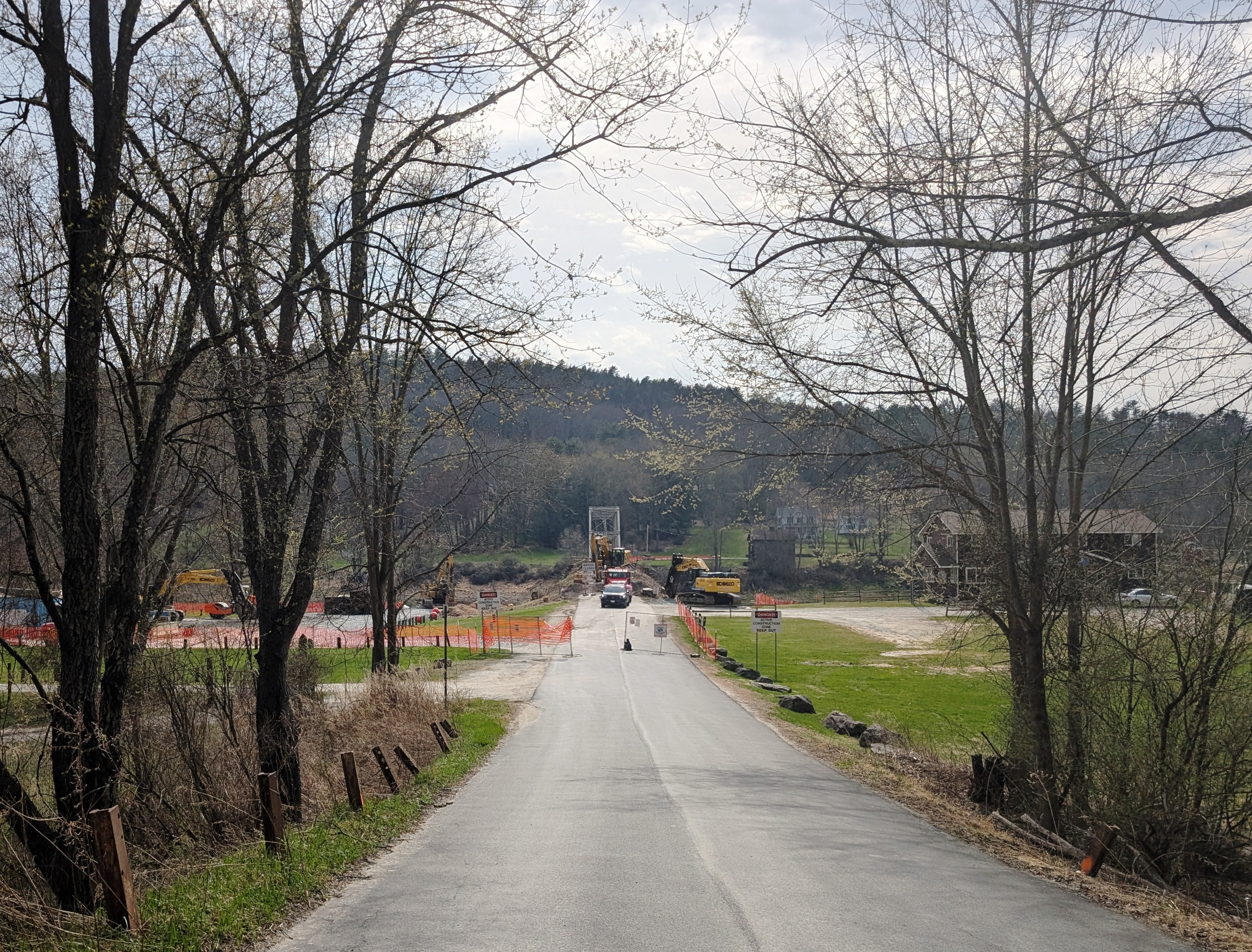
Partial demolition seen from the New York side on April 19, 2025

In February 2025, the Damascus Citizens for Sustainability filed a letter of intent to purchase the bridge from PennDOT in order to preserve the bridge from demolition. The organization would buy the bridge for $1 and get a sum of money from PennDOT to pay for the estimated $16 million it would cost to restore the bridge. PennDOT rejected the offer, stating that transfer of ownership would require a legislative act in both states. PennDOT offered to work with Damascus Citizens for Sustainability to mitigate the effects of the demolition, but would not agree to a transfer. Despite a groundbreaking on February 26, 2025, demolition of the bridge would begin in March 2025 with the preparation and construction of the demolition causeway. An inspection in January 2025 noted that the New York abutment and its truss bearings on the upstream side of the bridge were moving on an active basis and demolition was necessary for prevention of an accidental collapse.

Demolition work began on March 11, 2025. With construction of the causeway underway, a local resident of Damascus Township walked onto the bridge to make a statement about their opposition to the project. Cynthia Nash and the Damascus Citizens for Stability filed for an injunction to stop the demolition of the bridge on April 7. The judge assigned to the case filed a temporary restraining order on PennDOT to prevent work on the bridge on April 9 and a six-hour hearing came on April 11 to determine what to do. Damascus Citizens for Stability and PennDOT met during the hearing, but stated that the judge had 14 days to decide on the future of the bridge. Judge Karoline Mehalchick denied the request on April 15, and PennDOT announced that demolition would resume on April 17.

The Skinners Falls span was demolished on April 17. The Milanville span came down on the morning of April 21.

== Proposed reconstruction (2026) ==
The bridge site in 2026

On January 21, 2026, the superintendent of the Upper Delaware Scenic and Recreational River, Lindsey Kurnath, sent a letter to PennDOT as a reminder that the bridge was required to be replaced under state law. With Pennsylvania and New York sharing five bridges each in the New York–Pennsylvania Joint Interstate Bridge Commission, PennDOT owned the bridge and was responsible for its demolition. Kurnath went on to state that "removal of the bridge significantly impacted the scenic character Outstandingly Remarkable Values of the Upper Delaware," a metric tied to the Upper Delaware's designation as a Wild & Scenic River.

Further, the emergency management plans for the towns of Damascus, Pennsylvania, and Cochecton, New York were both impacted by the bridge's removal. PennDOT stated through a consultant that there was no funding for a replacement as of early 2026. There is also another impediment to the project, as landowners on the New York side are asserting their ownership reversion rights due to the bridge's removal. This removes access to Route 97.

== See also ==
- List of bridges and tunnels on the National Register of Historic Places in New York
- List of bridges on the National Register of Historic Places in Pennsylvania
- List of crossings of the Delaware River
- New York–Pennsylvania Joint Interstate Bridge Commission
- National Register of Historic Places listings in Sullivan County, New York
- National Register of Historic Places listings in Wayne County, Pennsylvania

== Bibliography ==
- AECOM (May 2023). "Historic Bridge Rehabilitation Analysis Phase 1 SR 1002 (Skinners Falls Road) over Delaware River" (PDF). Pennsylvania Department of Transportation.
- Dale, Frank T. (2003). Bridges Over The Delaware River: A History of Crossings. Piscataway, New Jersey: Rutgers University Press. ISBN 978-0-8135-3213-4.
- New York State Legislature (1923). New York Legislative Documents of the One Hundred and Forty-Sixth Session 1923. Albany, New York: J. B. Lyon Company.
- Pennsylvania General Assembly (1901). Laws of the General Assembly of the Commonwealth of Pennsylvania, Passed at the Session of 1901, in the One-Hundred and Twenty-Fifth Year of Independence. WM Stanley Ray.
