= Delaware and Hudson Canal Company Office =

- D & H Canal Co. Office
- U.S. National Register of Historic Places
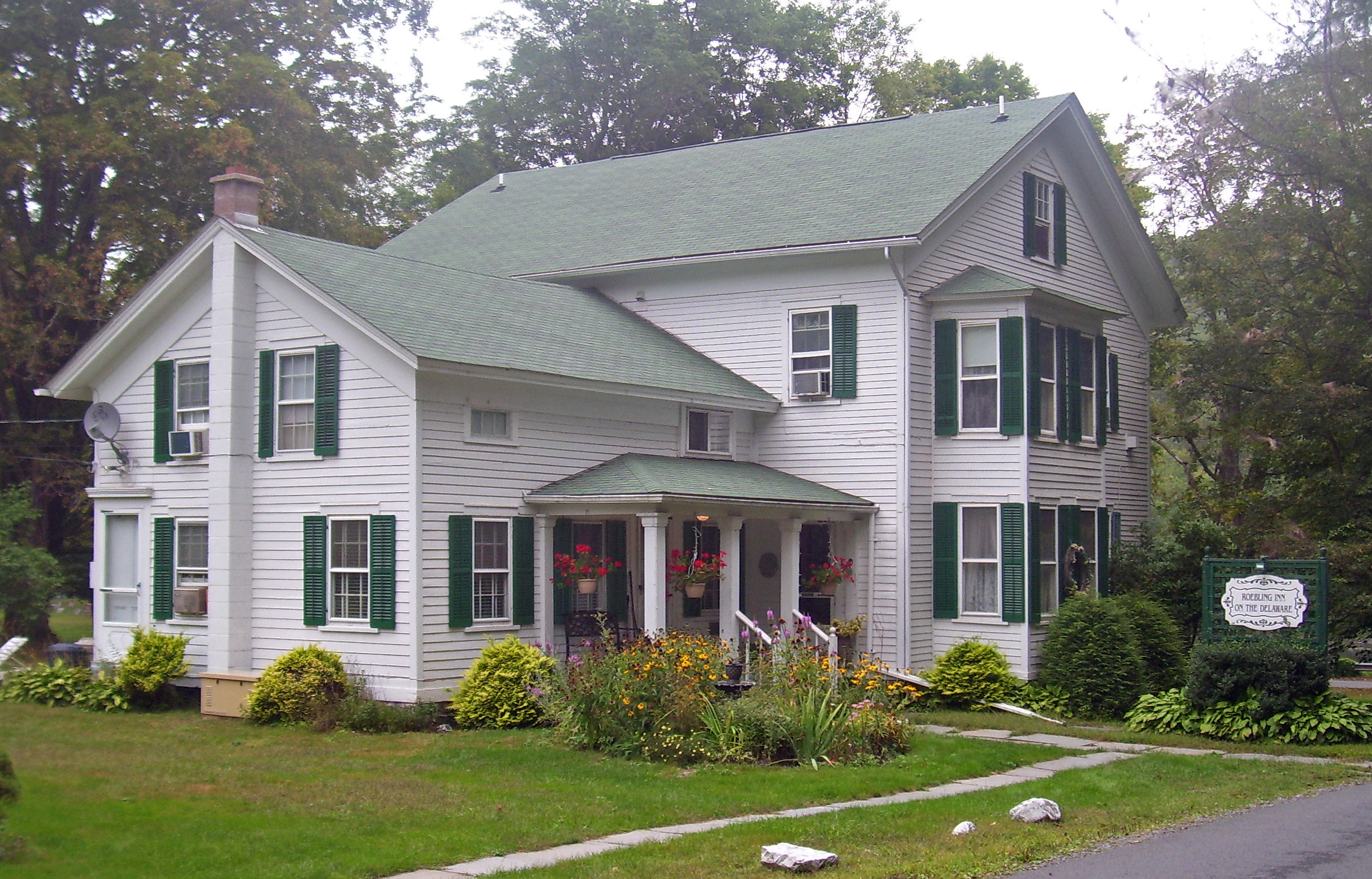
- Location: Lackawaxen, PA
- Nearest city: Port Jervis, NY
- Coordinates: 41°29′0″N 74°59′12″W
- Built: 1855
- Architectural style: Greek Revival
- MPS: Upper Delaware Valley, New York and Pennsylvania MPS
- NRHP reference No.: 93000715
- Added to NRHP: 1993

The D&H Canal Co. Office, now known as the Roebling Inn, is located on Scenic Drive in Lackawaxen, Pennsylvania, United States. It is a mid-19th century wooden house in the Greek Revival architectural style.

It was originally built by the company, which operated the nearby Delaware and Hudson Canal, as its regional office. Sold in 1898 to Charles W. Shannon when the canal was shut down, it was converted into a boarding house, a single-family private residence, and most recently a bed and breakfast. It remains mostly intact. In 1993 it was listed on the National Register of Historic Places.

== Property ==
The house is on an acre with two outbuildings along Scenic Drive, just off PA 590. It is a short distance north of Roebling's Delaware Aqueduct, one of the earliest suspension bridges in the United States, and a short distance south of the Zane Grey Museum. The property's lawn slopes gently down to the Delaware River to the east. A line of mature trees screens the property from some other residences nearby. Nearby are some filled-in sections of the canal. Most of the other property in the area is owned by the National Park Service as part of the Upper Delaware Scenic and Recreational River.

The building itself is a clapboard-sided gable-roofed frame structure two and a half stories tall on a foundation of random coursed stone. Its main block is five bays wide by two deep. Greek Revival detailing includes a frieze at the roofline and a transom and sidelights on the centrally located main entrance. A two-story bay window projects from the south elevation.

On the west side is a one-and-half-story, three-bay kitchen wing, added later. It has similar detailing to the main block. On its south side is a small porch, with a gently sloped roof supported by four square wooden columns. A cinder block chimney, the only one on the house, rises on the west.

Inside the house retains much of its original central-hall floor plan, minimally altered for its current use. Many rooms retain their original plaster finish. The attic's plaster walls and ceiling are unusual for a house of its era. There are no fireplaces, although a wooden ornamental mantel remains in the dining room.

There are two outbuildings: a carriage house and a cottage. Both are of similar material and design to the main house, but are not considered contributing resources to the National Register listing as their construction dates to the years after the canal company's ownership.

== History ==
Local records show the company owning the land as early as 1852, the year after the death of early canal administrator Thomas Tracey. It took several employees to do his duties, and the company began to develop a bureaucracy, with large houses along the canal's route for local administrators. No official company document survives designating this Lackawaxen property the Delaware and Hudson's regional office. That belief is instead supported by maps, company policies, physical evidence and local tradition. Since this section of the canal had frequent washouts, and it was close to the Delaware Lackawaxen aqueducts, which required regular maintenance, a regional administrator may well have seen this as an ideal site. It could also be used to keep an eye on the Lackawaxen Dam, which the company had stopped using once the aqueducts had been built but remained as a possible liability risk.

The original house, in 1855, was just the main block. Around 1870, the wing was added.

One company official known to have lived here was Thomas Ridgway, a former judge and regional administrator from 1876 until his death in 1888. Among surviving records are his tallies of lumber rafts going over the dam and under the aqueduct. This was to help reconcile claims they made against the company for damage to their rafts. As with other administrators, the building was both his home and his office. The finished attic probably served as lodging for workers brought in during high-maintenance periods.

A man named C.W. Shannon bought the building when the company abandoned the canal for its railroad interests in 1898. He converted it into a boarding house, taking in as many as 20 guests a week. His son ran his medical practice from here, and built the small cottage in the rear to see patients, as well as the carriage house.

As boardinghouses declined, the building became a private residence. In 1985 the present owners bought it and converted into a bed and breakfast.

== See also ==
- National Register of Historic Places listings in Pike County, Pennsylvania
