= Milanville Historic District =

Historic district in Pennsylvania, United States

- U.S. National Register of Historic Places
- U.S. Historic district
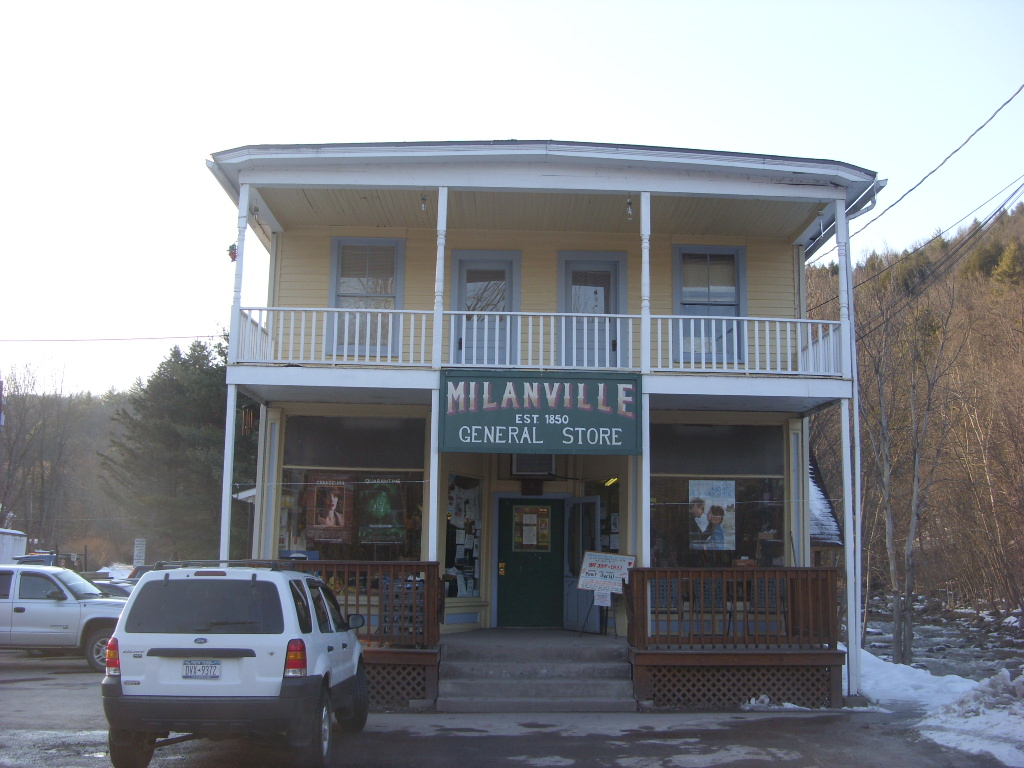
- Milanville General Store in Damascus Township, February 2009

- Location within Pennsylvania Location within the United States
- Location: Roughly, Rt. 63027 from jct. with Rt. 63029 E to Skinner's Falls Bridge via bridge approach rd., Milanville, Damascus Township, Pennsylvania
- Coordinates: 41°40′16″N 75°03′48″W
- Area: 20 acres (8.1 ha)
- Architectural style: Greek Revival, Queen Anne
- MPS: Upper Delaware Valley, New York and Pennsylvania MPS
- NRHP reference No.: 93000352
- Added to NRHP: April 29, 1993

The Milanville Historic District, is a national historic district that is located in Damascus Township, Wayne County, Pennsylvania.

The Milanville Historic District is situated at the confluence of Calkins Creek and the Delaware River, with the river to the east and New York State beyond. Wooded hills to the west form a backdrop for the community. The creek flows west-to-east along the northern edge of the district. River Road and Route 63029 intersect at the center of the village, forming a Y-shaped district. The district has nineteenth and early twentieth century vernacular architecture, influenced by Queen Anne, Italianate, Greek Revival and Gothic Revival architectural styles. Buildings are wood framed, most of them built between 1850 and 1910.

It was added to the National Register of Historic Places in 1993 by Dr. Brent D. Glass.

== History and architectural features ==
Few modern buildings intrude upon the district's historic appearance. Most of non-contributing buildings in the district are outbuildings. Of the 20 major structures, residences, and commercial buildings, only six are non-contributing, resulting in the overall impression of a high ratio of contributing to noncontributing buildings. Of the 13 buildings designated as noncontributing, six of them are garages or rear outbuildings. The great majority of buildings within the district retain their simple styling, with wood-frame construction, clapboard siding, gables, and full-width front porches, and are vernacular interpretations of a variety of popular architectural styles, including Greek Revival and Queen Anne. The non-contributing outbuildings are generally wood-frame, weatherboard or novelty sided, one-story gabled buildings, used as storage sheds or garages, and located unobtrusively to the rear of contributing buildings. Their location and size, coupled with the screening of landscaping and topography, results in their having little impact on the district's overall appearance.

== National Register of Historic Places Building Inventory ==
- J. Howard Beach Residence (c. 1870)
- Milanville Store (c. 1850)
- Phone Company Building (c. 1890)
- Ahearn Residence (c. 1880)
- Swendsen Residence (possibly late 19th century)
- Milanville Schoolhouse (c. 1880)
- Old Schoolhouse
- Volney Skinner House (c. 1840)
- Eli Beach House (c. 1850)
- Weston Skinner House (c. 1870)
- Frank Davis House (c. 1900)
- Ray Davis House (c. 1970s)
- Milanville Barbershop (c. 1880)
- Illman-Skinner House (c. 1910)
- Milanville Methodist Church (c. 1910)
- Arthur Holmes House (c. 1957)
- Nathan Skinner House (1815)
- trailer
- Milton Skinner House (c. 1900)
- Skinners Falls–Milanville Bridge (1902)
