= Barbara Yeaman =

American conservationist (1924–2025)

- Born: December 16, 1924; Pittsburgh, Pennsylvania, U.S.
- Died: April 6, 2025 (aged 100)
- Education: University of California, Irvine
- Occupation: Conservationist
- Known for: Founder of the Delaware Highlands Conservatory

Barbara Yeaman (December 16, 1924 – April 6, 2025) was an American conservationist, who was the founder of Delaware Highlands Conservancy, an accredited land trust serving Pike County, Pennsylvania, and Wayne County, Pennsylvania, Sullivan County, New York and Delaware County, New York

== Early life and education ==
Yeaman was born on December 16, 1924, near Pittsburgh, Pennsylvania. During World War II, she earned her pilot’s license to qualify for the Women Air Force Service Pilots. Yeaman later earned a degree in Environmental Studies at the University of California, Irvine.

== Career ==
In her early career, Yeaman worked as a Public Education Consultant and Water Conservation Coordinator at the U.S. Environmental Protection Agency.

She moved to the Upper Delaware River region in the early 1980s and became involved with the Citizens Advisory Council that helped to establish the Upper Delaware Scenic and Recreational River under the auspices of the National Park Service. This was during a time of intense controversy over private property rights in the region. Outbreaks of violence and arson occurred within the community during this process.

This intense experience as well as a cancer diagnosis is what led Yeaman to seek new preservation tools, such as conservation easements, to protect land along the Upper Delaware River; and it is ultimately what sparked her to found the Delaware Highlands Conservancy. “I was waiting for someone else to do it. But that didn't happen. I made a list of what was important to me, and starting a land trust was on the top of that list. I knew it could work,” Yeaman has said.

== Delaware Highlands Conservancy ==
Yeaman founded the conservancy in 1994, at the age of 70. Since that time, the conservancy has worked with private landowners using a tool called a conservation easement to protect more than 14,000 acres along the Upper Delaware River, which in 2010 was named Most Endangered River in the United States by American Rivers, a national conservation organization based in Washington, D.C. The headwaters of the Upper Delaware River provide drinking water for New York City and Philadelphia.

== Death ==
Yeaman died on April 6, 2025, at the age of 100.

== Awards ==
Yeaman was honored with the following awards for her land conservation efforts:

- 2003 Environmental Partnership Award by the Pennsylvania Environmental Council
- 2007 Ralph W. Abele Conservation Heritage Award from the Pennsylvania Fish and Boat Commission, which is "the highest recognition the PFBC provides to a person who has distinguished themselves in the cause of conservation."
