= Zane Grey Estate =

Historic house in California, United States

- U.S. National Register of Historic Places
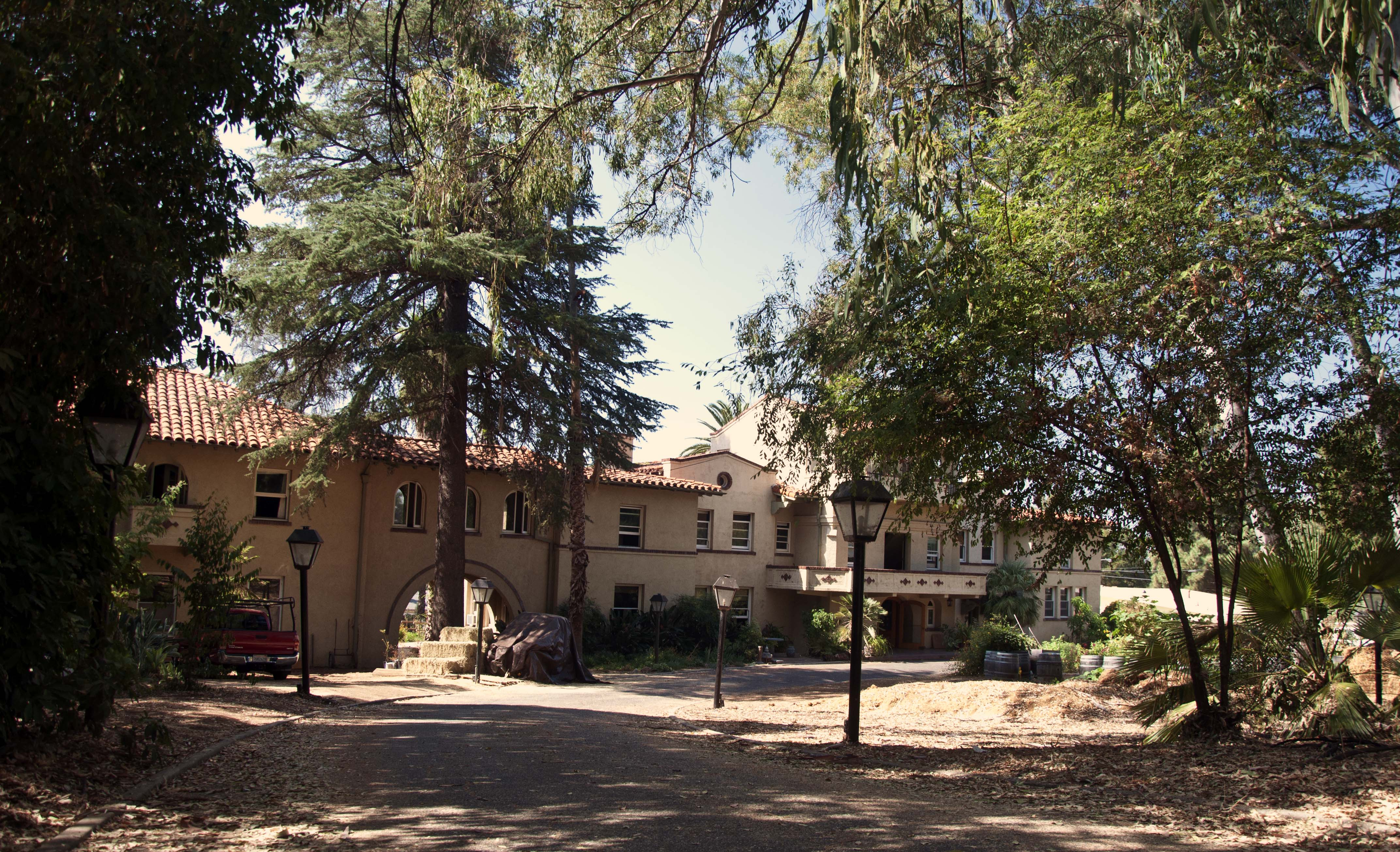

- Location within the Los Angeles metropolitan area Location within California Location within the United States
- Location: Altadena, California
- Nearest city: Los Angeles
- Coordinates: 34°11′26″N 118°08′30″W
- Built: 1907
- Architect: Myron Hunt and Elmer Grey
- Architectural style: Mission/Spanish - Mediterranean Revival
- Demolished: 2025 (Eaton Fire)
- NRHP reference No.: 02001187

The Zane Grey Estate was a historic house in Altadena, California. It was listed on the National Register of Historic Places in 2002.

The main house was built by Chicago business machine manufacturer Arthur Herbert Woodward. Designed by architects Myron Hunt and Elmer Grey, the 1907 Mediterranean Revival style house was acclaimed as the first "fireproof" home in Altadena, built entirely of reinforced concrete as prescribed by Woodward's wife, Edith Norton Woodward. Edith Woodward was a survivor of the Iroquois Theater Fire of 1903.

In 1920, spurred by the memory of a visit to Altadena during their honeymoon, author Zane Grey and his wife bought the home. After the Greys bought it they built an addition on the roof for a studio and library. After the Greys' death, their sons owned the property. The grounds were divided up and neighboring houses were built on them. The house was sold by their son, Romer, in 1970. The house went up for sale again in 2020.

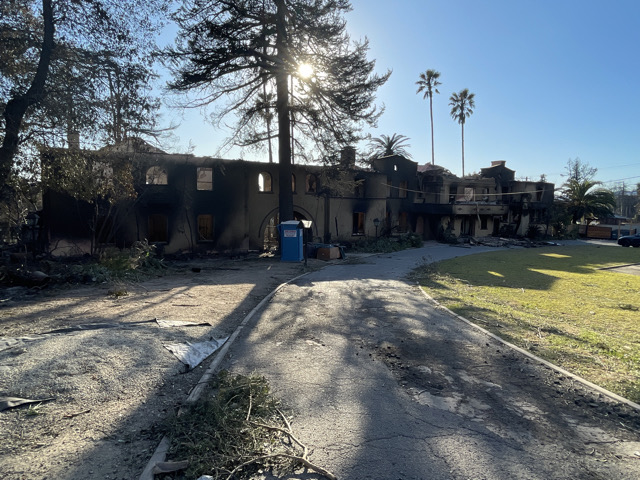
The Zane Grey Estate shortly after the Eaton Fire in January 2025

In January 2025, the home was destroyed by the Eaton Fire, leaving only some concrete walls standing.
