= Shohola =

Shohola may refer to:

- Shohola Creek, a tributary of the Delaware River in the Poconos of eastern Pennsylvania
- Shohola Falls, a 2003 novel written by Michael Pearson
- Shohola Township, Pennsylvania
- Shohola train wreck, occurred on July 15, 1864
