= Shohola Glen Amusement Park =

Defunct Pennsylvanian amusement park

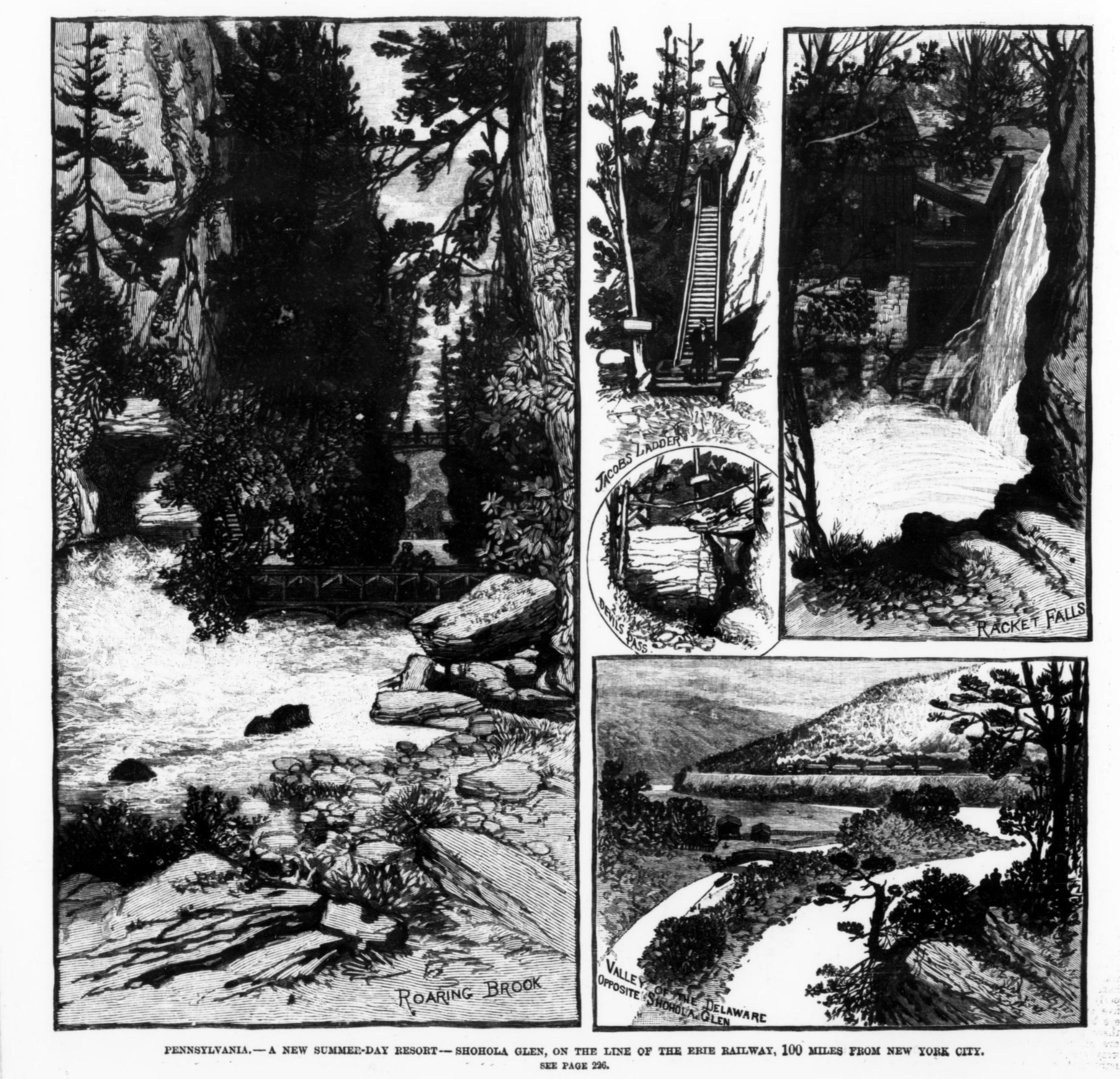
- Illustration of Shohola Glen
- Location: Shohola Township, Pennsylvania
- Coordinates: 41°28′18″N 74°54′51″W
- Status: Defunct
- Opened: 1884
- Closed: 1907
- Owner: John F. Kilgour (1884–1891), Charles St. John (1891–1891), George Lea (1891–1894), David L. Hardenbrook, George Sammis, Jr., Walter Sammis (1894–1899), David L. Hardenbrook (1899–1902), Henry W. Richardson (1902–1907)
- General manager: Edwin J. Fenton, George Proctor

Shohola Glen Amusement Park was an amusement park in Shohola Township, Pennsylvania. It operated from 1884 to 1907. The park's attractions included nature-related draws, and amusements such as a carousel, a skating rink, a boating area, a baseball field, and a dance hall.

== Background ==
By the mid-19th century, local merchant and bridge builder Chauncey Thomas owned Shohola Glen and surrounding areas of land. In 1849, Thomas built a hotel in Shohola, referred to by many names, including Shohola House, Shohola Hotel, Shohola Glen Hotel, and Rohman's Inn. On March 6, 1872, the hotel burned to the ground, likely due to sparks from a nearby steam locomotive.

The hotel was rebuilt on the same site in 1875. This hotel's restaurant would later become a popular lunch stopping point for excursionists to Shohola Glen because of the hotel's close proximity to both the Erie Railroad station in Shohola and the grand stairway to Shohola Glen.

By 1877, residents of the community of Shohola realized the potential of the natural beauty of Shohola Glen to draw visitors to the area. During the spring of 1877, Shohola inhabitants worked to clear underbrush, construct walkways, and build seats.

Visitors from New York City regularly came by train to Shohola during the summer season and stayed at the many boarding houses throughout Shohola Township. Although not yet an amusement park, visitors began to add Shohola Glen to the list of area attractions.

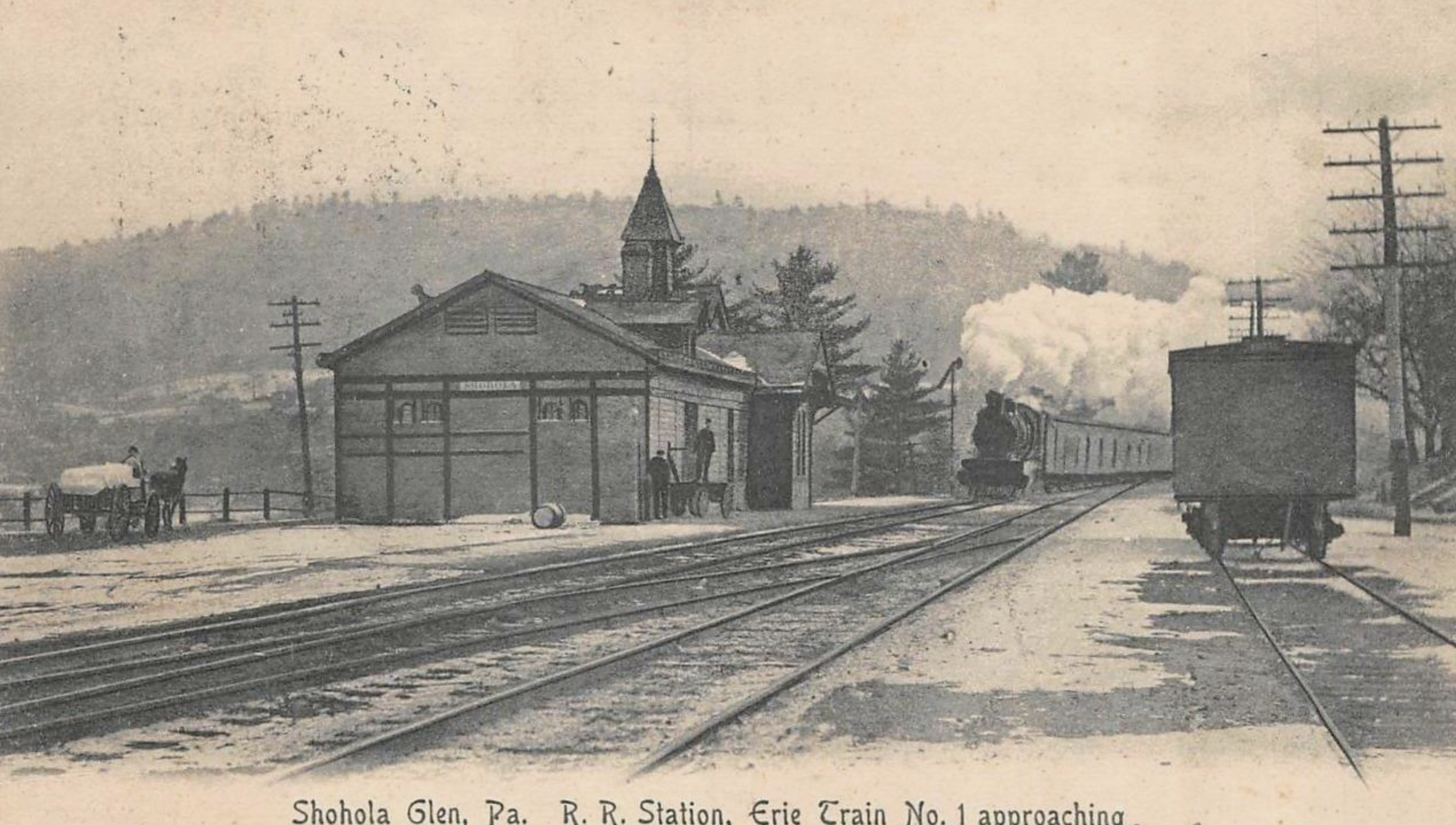

In 1879 area residents and business leaders worked to have more passenger trains stop at Shohola. At that time only one passenger train stopped at the Shohola station, the "Hojack." Shohola Glen and the Shohola House Hotel were cited as major reasons why more passenger trains should stop in Shohola.

== Inception of Shohola Glen Amusement Park ==
Chauncey Thomas died at his home in Shohola Glen on October 5, 1882. On June 25, 1884, John F. Kilgour, president of the Kilgour Blue Stone Company, purchased the Thomas estate which included Shohola Glen. Kilgour opened blue stone quarries on his new acquisition, but he also began to develop Shohola Glen to make it a summer destination. Kilgour also built a hotel near the glen. Kilgour opened Shohola Glen to the public during the 1884 summer season.

== Park attractions ==
=== Natural attractions ===
The Shohola Glen Amusement Park's annual operating season began around Memorial Day weekend in May and ended in September. The natural scenic views in Shohola Glen included features named Embattlement Rock, Winding Stairway, Below Glen Dam, From the Foot Bridge, Spirit of Dark Waters, Palisade Avenue, Entrance to Shohola Glen, Chauncey's Cliff, Spirit Cave, Crow Nest, Jacob's Ladder, Rustic Bridge, Picnic Rock, The Palisades, Witch's Boudoir, Tom Quick's Bluff, Erie Culvert, Hell Gate, Hemlock Stairway, and Layman's Ladder. Kilgour developed this area by building walks, bridges, and a large weather shelter with seats in the glen.

=== Baseball and boating ===
Advertisements for Shohola Glen in 1885 noted baseball, boating, fishing, a skating rink, a "Rhode Island" clambake, and music, in addition to the scenic attractions. Boating and fishing were done in Martha's Lake, a lake on the park's property. The Erie Railroad advertised Wednesday and Sunday summer train excursions from New York City to Shohola.

=== Skating rink and dance hall ===
The skating rink's floor was elevated above Shohola Creek, and was located under the large stone arch viaduct of the Erie Railroad across Shohola Creek. The arched roof of the railroad bridge made up the rink's ceiling and two sides of the rink. The skating rink was moved at some point to below Martha's Lake. The elevated floor within the stone viaduct that was previously used as the skating rink later became used for dancing. Live bands played on a balcony situated 15 feet above the dance floor. Electric lights were installed at some point, allowing the park to continue operation after dark.

=== Additional attractions ===
Additional attractions were added to the amusement park throughout its years in operation, such as a photo booth, bowling alleys, barbecue pits, and evening clambakes. There were also picnic grounds, shooting galleries, two restaurants, ice cream stands, game booths, and a Native American who displayed rattlesnakes and sold rattlesnake oil. A steam-powered carousel was also added in 1892.

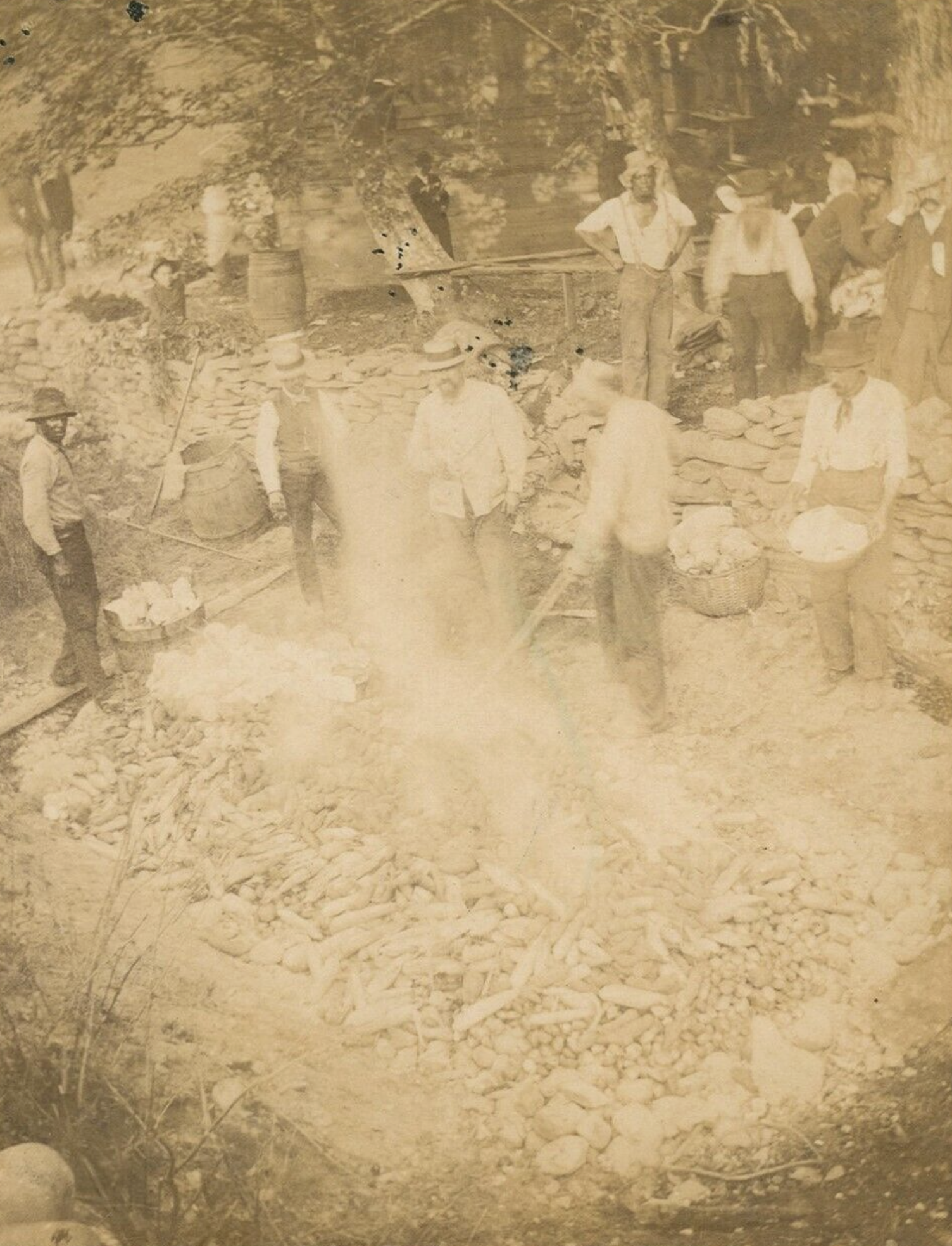
Postcard photo of regularly scheduled clambake at Shohola Glen Amusement Park

An aerial tramway was also constructed, which carried visitors the length of Shohola Glen over 100 feet above Shohola Creek. It was water-powered, and because it sloped toward the sawmill, it only required power to move the cable car in the opposite direction.

During the 1902 season, an Erie Railroad freight caboose was added to Shohola Glen Amusement Park. Erie Railroad Caboose #4259 was presented by the Erie Railroad president to Lieutenant Robert E. Peary in July 1898 to be used during his 1898–1902 expedition to Greenland. When this caboose was installed at Shohola Glen Amusement Park, its interior was decorated with views of the arctic region and of Peary and his expedition crew. The caboose remained on display at Shohola Glen until the park closed in 1907.

== Early access to the park ==
During the first season of the park, visitors disembarking the train at Shohola Station would go directly across the street to the Shohola Glen Hotel. From there a number of "finger boards" would direct the visitor to the amusement park. A plank walk led from the hotel along the railroad tracks to the Grand Stairway, which was three flights of stairs by which visitors would descend to enter the amusement park. Upon reaching the bottom of the stairs, a stretch of level ground led to the glen entrance.

== Park access by switchback gravity railroad ==
The 1886 operating season began with the addition of a switchback gravity railroad. This narrow-gauge railroad, modeled after the gravity railroads used by coal mines, carried visitors to and from Shohola Glen. There were two stations that served the gravity railroad. One was in the village of Shohola, located a short walk from the Erie Railroad’s Shohola station. The other was located at the new entrance of Shohola Glen Amusement Park. The switchback railroad began service on June 20, 1886, and thousands of people showed up that day to ride it.

The lift used to raise the rail cars was powered by a sawmill that was built in 1790 on Shohola Creek. Rail cars coasted down-hill using gravity and up-slopes were added to slow the cars down as they approached the stations.

== Travel to the park ==
Visitors to Shohola Glen Amusement Park were excursionists who traveled by train to Shohola for the day, or vacationers who stayed at one of the many vacation boarding houses near Shohola. When placing ads in New York City newspapers, boarding house proprietors would often note the close proximity of Shohola Glen in addition to their other features.

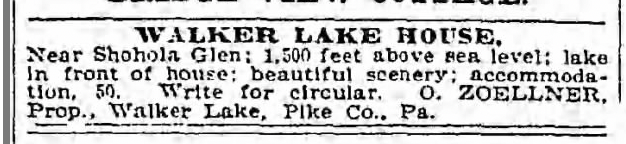
Advertisement for Walker Lake House summer resort which notes close proximity to Shohola Glen

Many of the park's visitors each year came from New York City and North New Jersey. The Erie Railroad ran inexpensive excursions trains on Sundays, Wednesdays, and holidays that began from the Erie Depot in Jersey City and ended at the Shohola Train Station in Shohola. Round trip excursion train fare was generally around $1.00 during most years. During September and October, special excursions to Shohola Glen Amusement Park were advertised by the Erie Railway.

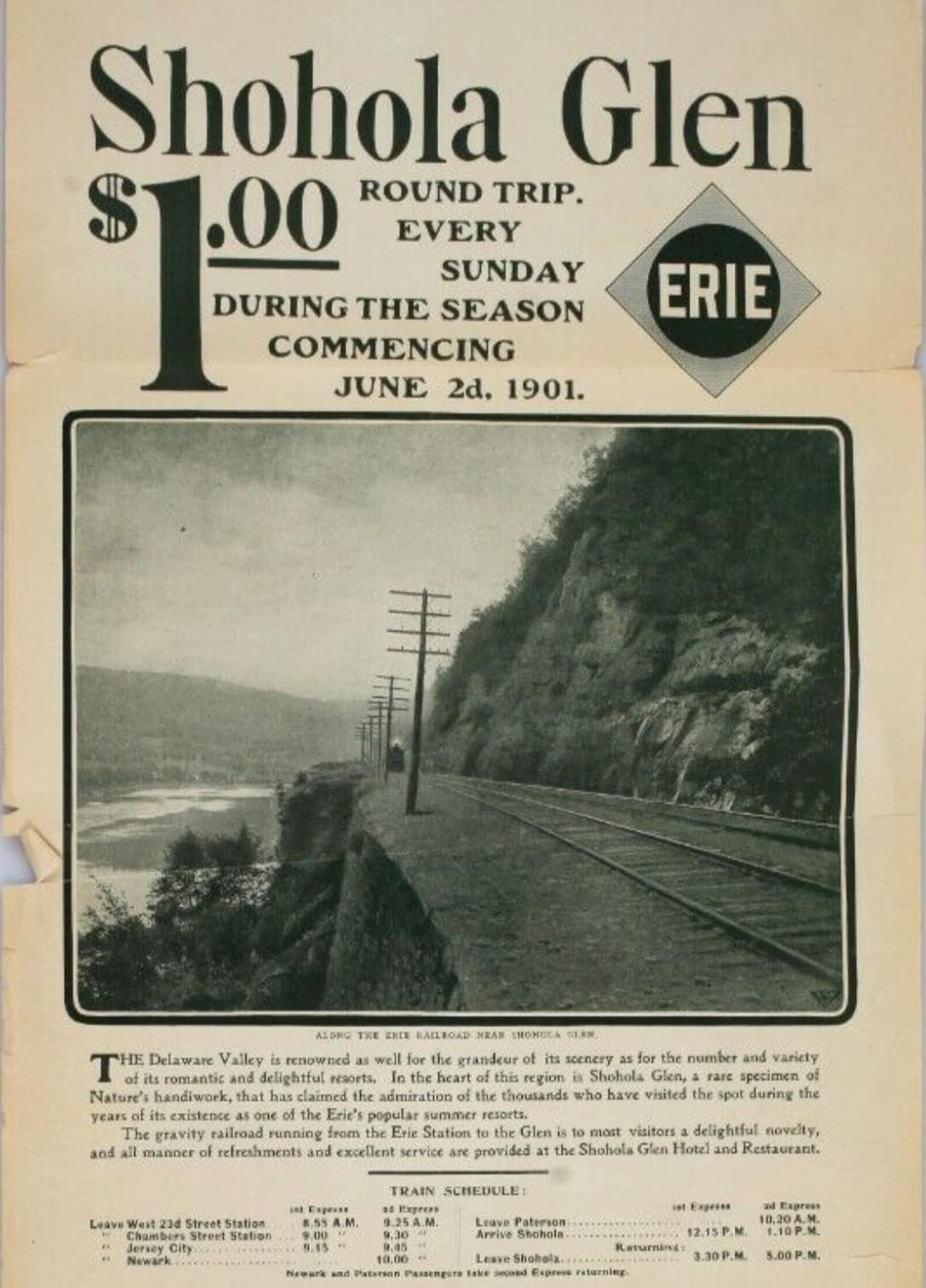
Shohola Glen 1901 season flyer

== Reputation challenges ==
As Shohola Glen Amusement Park became more popular, daily excursion populations at the parks would often be in the thousands. The park began to gain a poor reputation. Swindlers regularly set up thimble rig and three-card monte tables at the park to fleece unwary excursionists. By 1894, park management began using police officers in the park to arrest and jail swindlers. This police presence slowed the swindlers, but it did not stop them. Some swindlers did not wait to get to the park, and set up their operations on the excursion trains while traveling to Shohola.

An example of the regional attitude toward Shohola Glen Amusement Park can be found in an 1894 newspaper editorial which challenged the notion of Erie Railroad excursion trains from New York City bringing excursionists to Middletown, NY to visit Midway Park, an amusement park that opened the same year. The writer argued "As the park stands today it is popular with Middletowners and people in surrounding places because it is not, like Shohola Glen, the resort of a rabble of a great city, but rather a beautiful, quiet and orderly retreat where local societies, churches, Sunday schools and families may enjoy a day's outing without coming in contact with gamblers, toughs and the rough characters generally that make up New York's Sunday excursions."

A visitor in August 1901 claimed that Shohola Glen Amusement Park was "worse than Coney Island ever dared to be even in its most palmiest days." He claimed that the front doors of the Shohola Glen Hotel were "wide open", with "sixty-three people in the bar room drinking their favorite beverages." He saw a "spindle wheel on the street in full operation" as well as slot machines. He also noted that "Up in the glen proper, a mile from town, beer was being sold and served by waitresses who seemed underage, and at one place a 12-year-old boy was serving drinks."

Brawls breaking out in the evenings among drunk guests and continued problems with swindlers at Shohola Glen were also reported, but despite the negative reputation, Shohola Glen Amusement Park remained popular and full excursion trains continued to arrive at the park. Notably, on August 31, 1902, Erie excursion trains carried 28,000 visitors to the park.

== Closure of the park ==
Although summer vacationers in Shohola Township and Sullivan County frequented Shohola Glen Amusement Park, it was the crowds coming by excursion trains, especially from New York City, that brought most of the business. Both the Erie Railroad and Shohola Glen benefited from the use of excursion trains.

An April 1906 news report quoted Erie Railroad officials who stated that the excursion trains would cease for two reasons: The Erie Railroad Traffic Department had complained for years that the Sunday excursion trains seriously interfered with the moving of freight over the Delaware and New York Divisions, and the possibility of a collision or serious accident were greatly increased. Additionally, the Erie Railroad Passenger Division complained that many of the summer boarders who frequented the countryside hotels and boarding houses surrounding Shohola were taking advantage of the Sunday excursion trains to get a cheap rate to and from New York City, resulting in a loss to the railroad company in passenger receipts.

Shohola Glen Amusement Park closed after the 1907 season when the Erie Railroad excursion trains ceased operations. In July 1908, Henry W. Richardson, the owner of the park, leased the Shohola Glen land, buildings, and switchback railroad to the Pennsylvania Coal Company.
