= Barryville–Shohola Bridge =

Road bridge

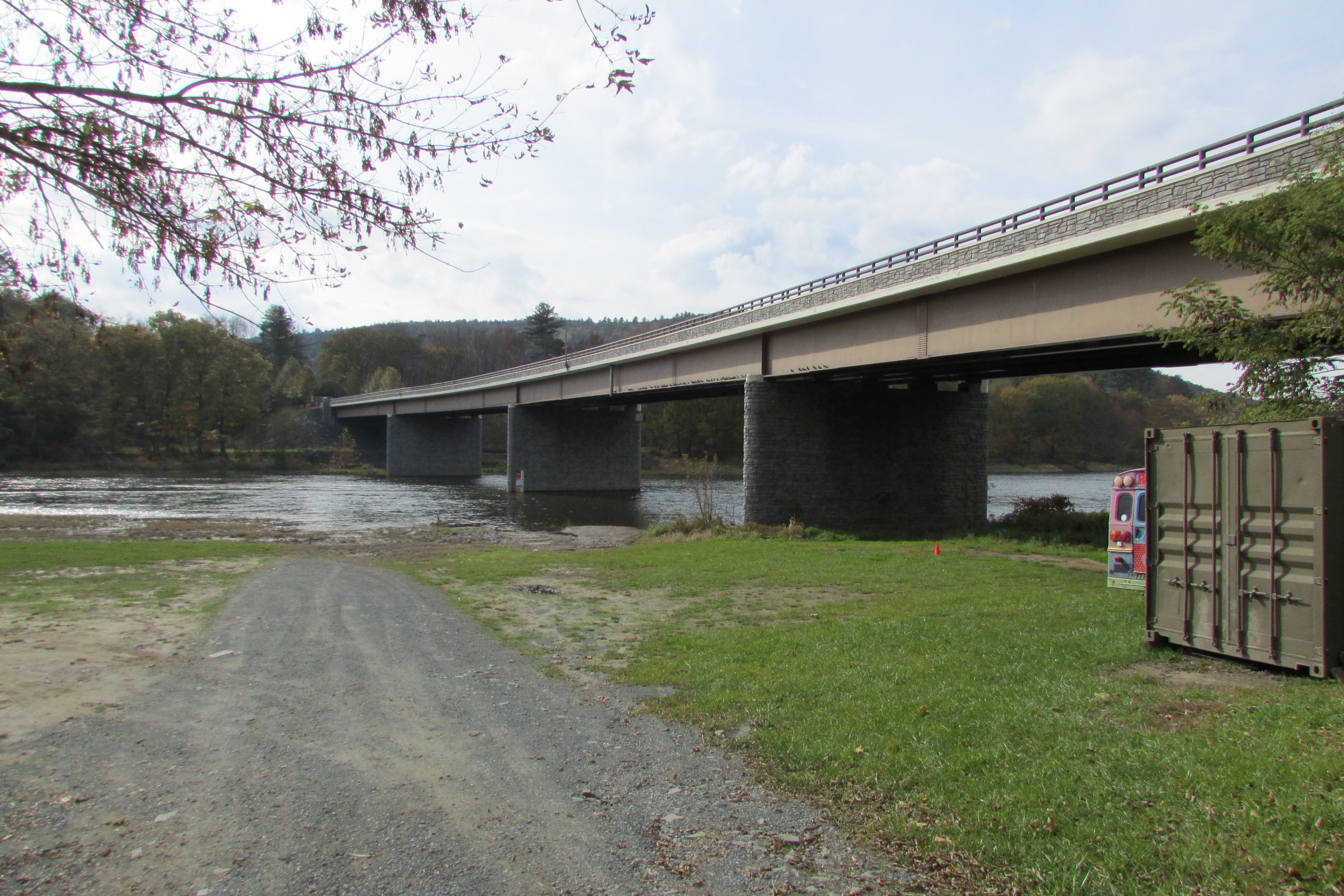
- Coordinates: 41°28′33″N 74°54′46″W
- Carries: 2 lanes of PA 434 and NY 55/ CR 11
- Crosses: Delaware River
- Official name: Barryville–Shohola Bridge
- Owner: New York–Pennsylvania Joint Interstate Bridge Commission
- Maintained by: New York–Pennsylvania Joint Interstate Bridge Commission
- Preceded by: Barryville–Shohola Suspension Bridge (1854–1939); Barryville–Shohola Bridge (1941–2007)

Characteristics
- Total length: 812 feet (247 m)
- Width: 23 feet (7.0 m)
- No. of spans: 1

History
- Designer: Chauncey Thomas (1855; 1859; 1866); Whittaker & Diehl Company (1941); Fahs Construction Group (2004)
- Construction start: February 2004
- Construction end: 2007
- Opened: 2007 (current)

Statistics
- Daily traffic: 1,623 average (2004)
- Toll: None (after 1920)

Location
- Interactive map of Barryville–Shohola Bridge

The Barryville–Shohola Bridge is the fifth generation of bridges constructed over the Delaware River at the communities of Shohola Township, Pennsylvania and Barryville, New York. The bridge serves both communities, with two major state legislative highways, Pennsylvania Traffic Route 434 and New York State Touring Route 55 (along with the co-designation of Sullivan County Route 11). The bridge itself is 812 feet (247 m) long and is 23 feet (7.0 m) wide, using four total spans across the river. It is maintained by the NY–PA Joint Interstate Bridge Commission, which is jointly owned by the states of New York and Pennsylvania.

The area of the bridge itself dates as a ford for Native Americans, mostly the Lenni Lenapi, traveling between from the Wyoming valley and Delaware Valley and present-day Connecticut in the early 18th century; archaeologists date human habitation and use of the area to 10,900 BCE. The river at Shohola, which means "place of peace," widens perceptibly above the falls, allowing for a natural, shallow crossing. By the early 19th century, a ferry facilitated crossing the river. Due to the construction of the nearby Delaware and Hudson Canal in 1827, commerce and business boomed in the area. In 1856, a bridge company, under the leadership of Chauncey Thomas, constructed a span between the two communities, but it was poorly designed and collapsed during a windstorm in 1859. Thomas then constructed a suspension bridge, but its cables snapped in 1865.

In 1866, the bridge was reconstructed as a two-lane, single span wooden suspension structure and remained in use for over seventy years. Ownership changed several times, eventually ending with the bridge in the control of the Joint Delaware River Bridge Commission. The bridge was replaced again in 1941 for $174,300 (1941 USD ($3,815,300 in 2025)), with a steel truss span. This structure lasted another sixty-five years, finally deteriorating until the demolition of the structure in 2007, upon completion of the new bridge.

== Early history ==
Originally the site of a ford, the area was used by the Lenni Lenape and Delawares on their way to and from the shores of present-day Long Island Sound. The original trail followed the Shohola Creek, where it enters the Delaware, to a location along the eastern bank of the river near Shohola. By the end of the 18th century, European settlers operated a ferry near the current span, crossing between Shohola to a settlement on the opposite bank, that later became Barryville. The 1827 construction of the Delaware and Hudson Canal and the subsequent construction of the Erie Railroad in 1849) accentuated the need for a bridge to accommodate the increase in population and business in the area.

== First two spans (1856–1865) ==
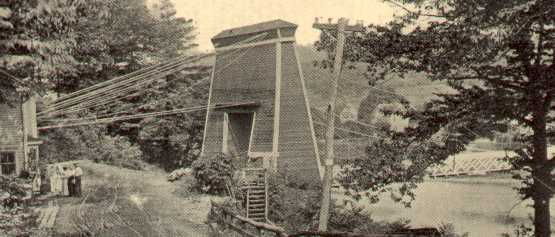
The first span in 1856 over the river

As the need for a bridge from Shohola to Barryville grew, the Shohola and Barryville Bridge Company, formed in 1854, planned the construction of the first bridge. The company's president, Chauncey Thomas, attempted to hire John Augustus Robeling, a bridge expert, who was building a bridge in the Niagara region of New York and Canada (which came to be known as the Niagara Falls Suspension Bridge), which was to be built as an 821 feet (250 m) two-deck span over the Niagara River, and who had completed successful spans over the rivers in Pittsburgh, Pennsylvania.

Roebling declined the offer but gave Thomas verbal and written instructions on its construction during a visit to the Niagara construction site. Thomas returned to Shohola and supervised the construction himself, using some inexperienced local men he hired. A respected historian, John Willard Johnston, who knew Chauncey Thomas personally, visited the bridge and told the owner at the time that Thomas was very inexperienced in bridge construction. The result of the construction was a 10-foot (3.0 m) wide, double-span bridge that was 495 feet (151 m) long but which had no underlying span support. The bridge stood 25 feet (7.6 m) above the waters of the Delaware to avoid flooding, and cost a total of $9,000 (1856 USD ($322,500 in 2025). The rapid growth of the area due to the construction of the Canal and the Erie Railroad meant the bridge was immediately in heavy use.

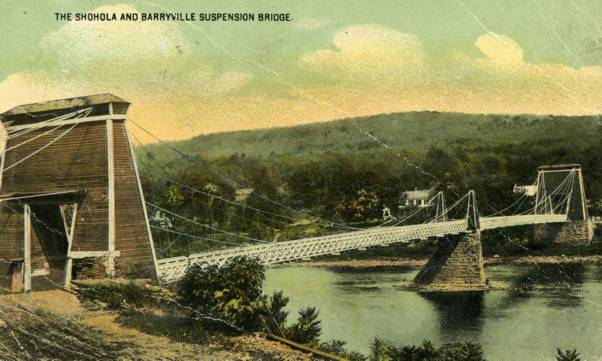
View at the first span of the entire bridge

Thomas' wire-rope span bridge was damaged by a severe wind storm on July 2, 1859, exactly three years after it opened. The storm, which destroyed almost the entire bridge, was not a singular experience. Wind storms often build in the river valley, bring strong winds down the valley against weaker pressure systems to the south and east. A man and a woman who were crossing the bridge were injured when it collapsed. The local ferry, which had been out of commission for only three years, was still in good condition and re-fitted for use in 1859, to operate along the remaining abutments and piers that survived the storm.

The bridge was rebuilt quickly, again under the supervision of Thomas, who was still company president. Thomas was able to complete the bridge, and ended up raising a total cost for construction of $4,000 (1859 USD ($143,300 in 2025))), an expedient necessitated by the lack of funds in the company treasury. Shortly after the new construction, Thomas was replaced by James E. Gardner as company president; Gardner died soon after his election, and was succeeded by Napoleon B. Johnson. Johnson ran the bridge company well, and remained as president of the corporation for several years. However, on January 1, 1865, the cables snapped under the weight of mules and wagons, and the entire bridge fell into the river, injuring the wagoners, and drowning three of the mules. Once again, ferries filled the needs that were previously fulfilled by the suspension bridge.

== Third span (1866–1939) ==
With the second span of the Barryville–Shohola Suspension Bridge having fallen into the Delaware River in 1865, the bridge company that maintained the span fell into a financial depression. After the destruction of the second span, company president Johnson had borrowed money for the company itself that he was unable to pay back. In 1865, company had no funds to repair the partially collapsed bridge, nor credit to borrow any. The former president Chauncey Thomas bought the bankrupt company in a sheriff's sale for $1,979 (1865 USD ($41,600 in 2025)). Thomas was now the sole owner of the wrecked bridge.

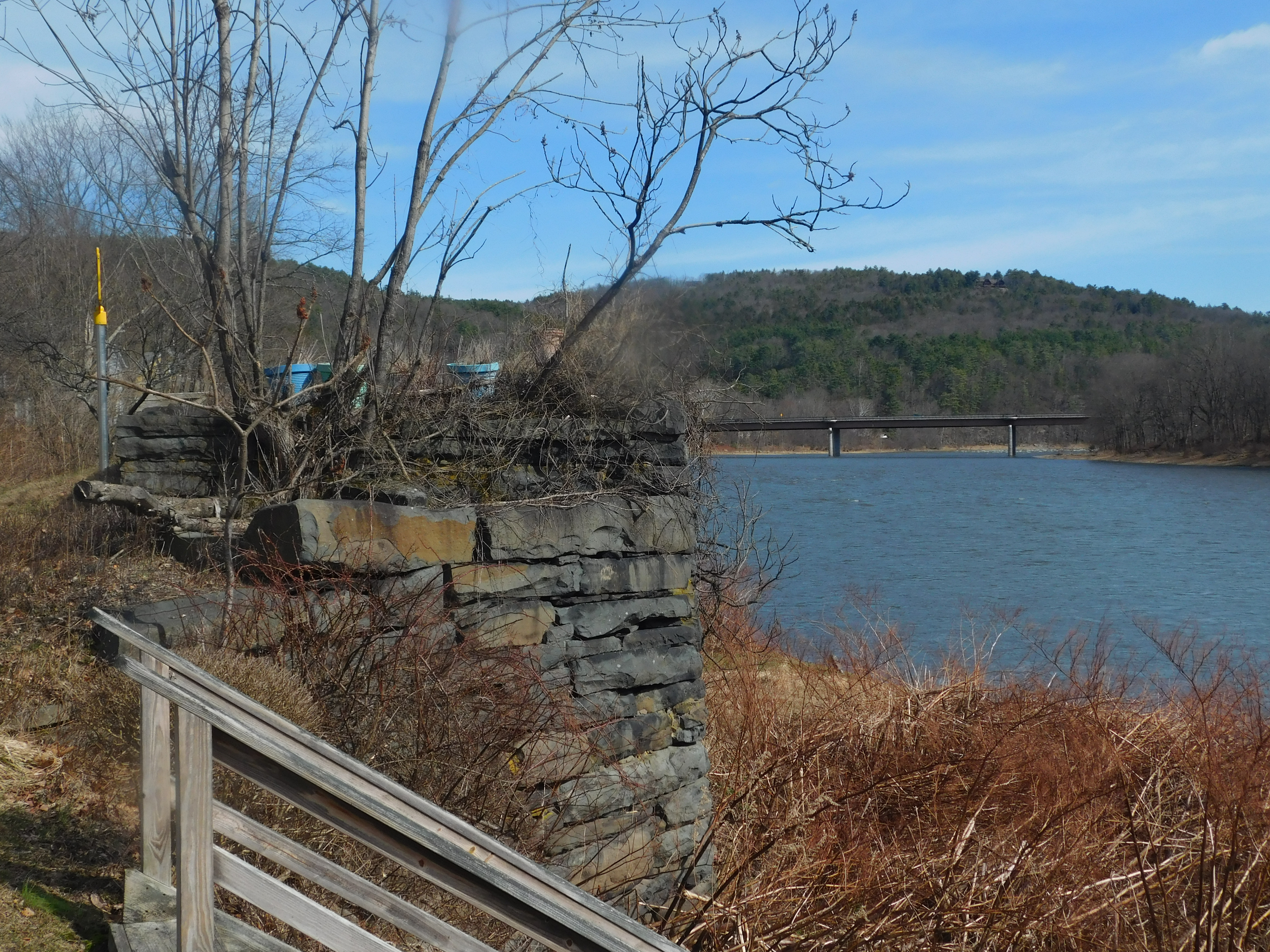
The former Barryville abutment of the suspension bridge in March 2026

To repair the bridge, Thomas would need to receive and pay more money, and he did. Along with the complete repair in 1866, another pier was added to increase the stability of the weak structure. The 1866 construction was considerably stronger, compared to the two previous spans, due to major renovations. The old cables that snapped had been replaced by newer, stronger ones. Thomas also gave the span a new deck floor, a bridge railing and new stringers. The bridge was much better cared for this time around, as it also survived a local flood in 1903 and an icestorm in the early months of spring 1904.

Chauncey Thomas died at his home in Shohola on October 5, 1882, sixteen years after the new bridge was repaired. Since Thomas had never written a will, estate and property were divided between his children and his grandchildren. A friend to the Thomas family, Stephen St. John Gardiner, became the administrator of the estate. With the job, Gardiner was able to buy the bridge. He became controller and majority of the bridge's stock.

By the start of the 20th century, regional economic conditions changed. The Delaware and Hudson Canal Company had closed, as had local logging and mining companies. Shohola and Barryville had become summer resorts and the now-aging antique bridge had become a local picturesque attraction for out-of-town visitors. On June 26, 1920, the suspension bridge was bought by the Joint Bridge Commission of Pennsylvania and New York for $22,600.00 (1923 USD ($363,200 in 2025)). Half of the $22,600.00 was to be paid for by the state of New York, the other by Pennsylvania. The toll that was used on the span was removed. The single-lane, aging structure, now owned by the commission, served the local residents well into the new century. However, the old age of the bridge showed on the bridge itself. In 1939, the commission closed off the structurally deficient bridge to traffic, and began looking into ways to build a new bridge in the area. In 1940, the bridge was reopened for light, local car traffic. but demolished in 1941, when the fourth and then-newest span of the bridge was opened.

== Fourth span (1941–2007) ==
=== Replacement proposals (1936–1939) ===
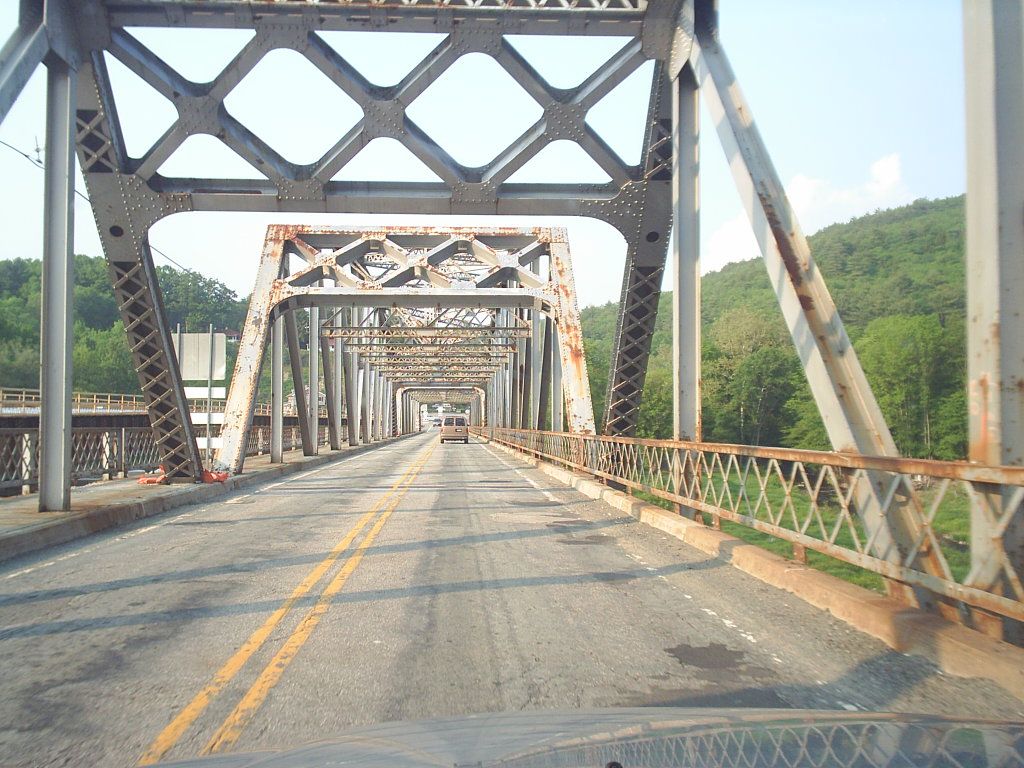
Driving along the fourth span of the Barryville–Shohola

Proposals for a new bridge between Barryville and Shohola were developed in March 1936. With the deteriorating condition of the suspension bridge, the Interstate Bridge Committee of New York and Pennsylvania would invest money replacing the structure. The urgency of a new bridge was added due to high traffic rate off State Route 97 in Barryville. Along with the reconstruction of the Lordville–Equinunk Bridge and the Kellams Bridge and painting of several other bridges, the expenditure would cost at least $500,000 (1936 USD, 11,600,700 in 2025). The Committee already had provisional approval for the money from Arthur Brandt of the New York State Highway Department.

By May 1936, officials of the Pennsylvania State Highway Department approved plans for the construction of a new bridge. A new bridge would be built 0.25 miles (0.40 km) downstream from the current structure and at a wider point in the river. The new bridge would be a steel open-top bridge that would be 28 feet (8.5 m) wide and almost 1,000 feet (300 m) long. The bridge have a footpath for pedestrians to use. Sullivan County engineers noted that drilling was underway to ensure the safety of a bridge at the new location and that the construction would involve 70–80 workers from New York and Pennsylvania. This was as part of an agreement for the approval of the new structure.

In late June 1936, President of the United States Franklin Delano Roosevelt signed a bill to allow the commission to build a new bridge between Barryville and Shohola.

No construction was started in 1936. In January 1937, the Commission announced that they would begin construction of the new bridge in the spring of 1937. Changes were made to the design of the new bridge. The new bridge would be 562 feet (171 m) long and 30 feet (9.1 m) wide. 24 feet (7.3 m) would be used for vehicles, making it wide enough for two cars to pass each other. The footpath would make the rest of the 8 feet (2.4 m) of the width. With construction of the new bridge, several properties in Barryville would have to be condemned, including a local store. Both states would pay half the cost for construction of the new steel bridge.

Construction did not begin in the Spring of 1937, and on July 26, Albert G. Rutherford (R–Honesdale), requested that the United States Congress extend the deadline for construction of the new bridge. The bill passed the United States House of Representatives and was moved to the Senate in August 1937. The official reaso nfor the delay was issues with the acquisition of land on the new location. On August 23, President Roosevelt signed the legislation to extend the timeline of the bridge authorization.

The request for bids on a new bridge came at Harrisburg, Pennsylvania on July 14, 1939. Less than a week later, Fred Kessler, a contractor from Northumberland, Pennsylvania won the bid for the new bridge with a total of $288,000 ($6682000 in 2025). However, despite the bid, the contract had not been let due to lack of federal funds available for construction. Rumors also spread that the Pennsylvania Railroad Commission would have to agree to eliminate the crossing of the Erie Railroad at this location before construction could begin.

=== Emergency closure (1939–1940) ===
On August 28, 1939, officials with the Pennsylvania side of the Commission closed down the suspension bridge at Barryville and Shohola. Barricades were placed at each entrance of the one-lane structure with signage denoting that the bridge had been condemned, resulting a detour via Lackawaxen, Pennsylvania to get to the two communities via the toll bridge. The Pennsylvania Highway Division and the Interstate Bridge Commission shut the bridge down after an inspection on August 24 by the two agencies. One of the capstones of the bridge support towers had fallen and that cable anchorages cracked, resulting in the trusses stiffening. Due to the age of the wooden trusses, the decision was made to close the bridge until further notice. The failing of the suspension bridge structure had been monitored for several weeks prior, with weight limits posted to prevent further deterioration.

The bridge closure resulted in arguing of bi-state politicians, noting that the closure was a direct violation of interstate agreements, even with the poor condition of the structure. L. Lamont Hughes, the Secretary of Pennsylvania Highways, stated that the closure was necessary while Peter Callahan, the supervisor of Highland, New York, stated that he and Governor of New York Herbert H. Lehman had agreement to continue the operation of the bridge with the weight limits until the delayed replacement structure was finished. Engineers from the state of New York stated that cars should be allowed on the bridge and that guards be posted 24 hours a day to monitor for trucks attempting to the use the deteriorating structure. Callahan added just prior to the introduction of the barricades, at most 14 vehicles had used the structure without issue. Callahan added that the toll bridge at Lackawaxen was also condemned but still maintained for lower weight cars without closure of the structure. On September 26, Callahan told the press after a conference with engineers from both New York and Pennsylvania that the bridge would be reopened on either September 27 or September 28. The barricades were removed at the bridge by October 1, but that no vehicle traffic was allowed to use the structure. As a result, the bridge was usable only to pedestrians for the time being.

Pike County officials were notified in early October 1939 by L. Lamont Hughes that a study of the current structure was done. They added that it would be possible to do rehabilitation work on the bridge to permit singular vehicles at a time to cross the suspension structure so that connection would be made via the two communities and not via Lackawaxen. He added that the barricades were adjusted to allow the pedestrian traffic and apologized about the inconvenience that the closure had caused on the two communities. Hughes added that as soon as design work was done then rehabilitation work would begin. Officials from the New York State Highway Department inspected the bridge on October 25 and told Callahan that construction could begin the first week of November. The piers were found to be in reasonable shape and that the new rehabilitation plan would work only on the floor of the structure and its wooden cables. New York officials got approvals of the rehabilitation plan by Pennsylvania on October 25 and expected approval from the state of New York soon after. However, work was delayed on the new project into late December 1939. Hughes added that the plans were all approved and as soon as materials were acquired, repairs would begin.

The crew for the rehabilitation work arrived in mid-January 1940 to begin construction. With the construction underway for six weeks, all pedestrians were kept off the bridge. The bridge had steel beams added to the superstructure to help keep the strength of the piers intact. After being inspected by highway engineers from both states, the barricades were removed and cars were allowed back on the structure on March 8, 1940.

=== Construction of new bridge (1940–1941) ===
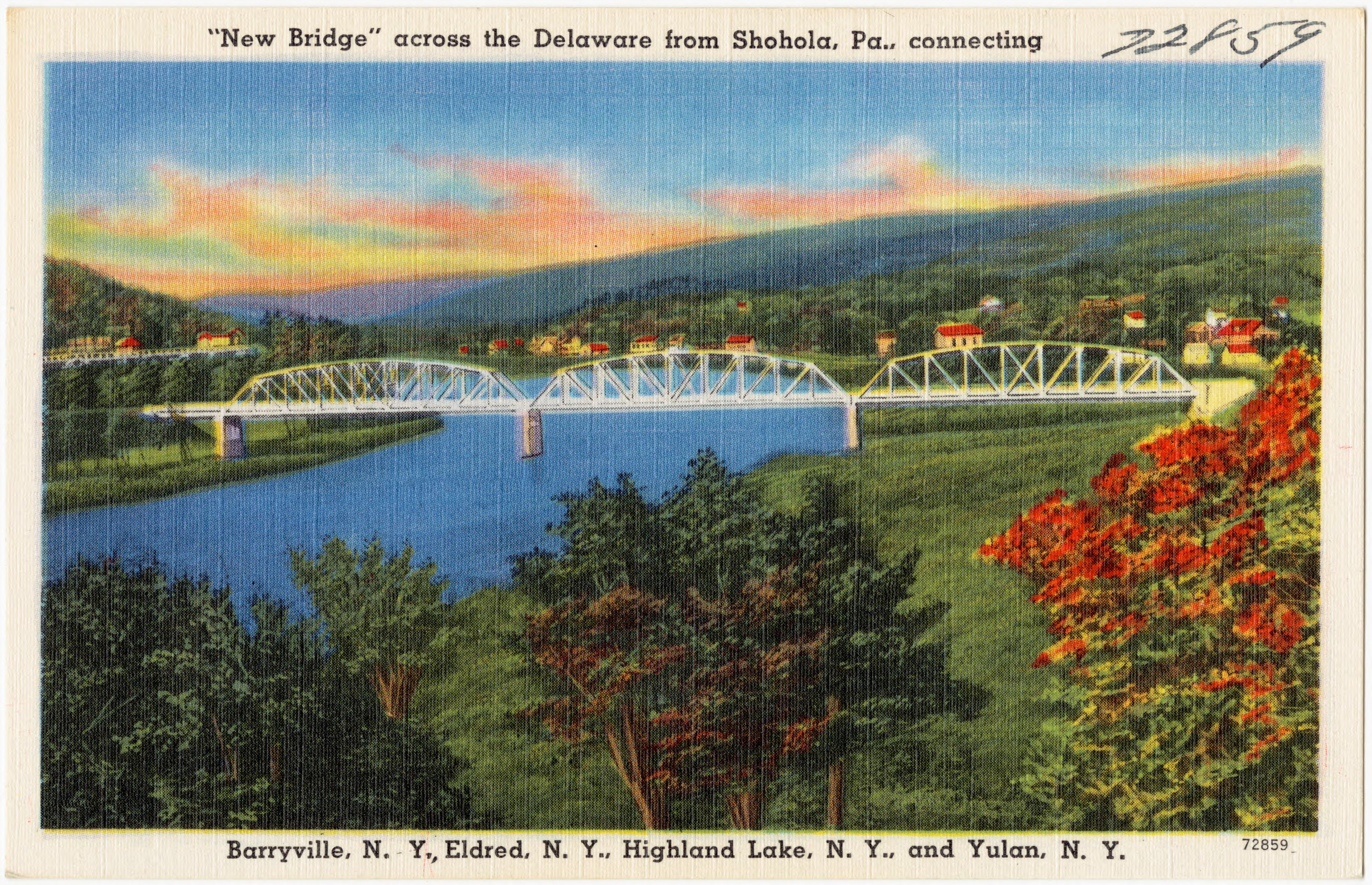
The new bridge between Barryville and Shohola shown on a postcard

During the repair work to support the suspension bridge, it was announced that a new contract with federal funding had been let for construction of a new bridge between Barryville and Shohola. In mid-March 1940, Representative Gaylord Caprenter learned from officials that the new bridge would not start construction until at least June 19, 1940 due to a new bill to extend the completion date of the new bridge. The new bill added that the completion would have to be done within three years of June 19, 1939.

Callahan's anger returned when he learned that the repaired bridge was being closed at night, rather than monitored 24 hours daily. UInstead, bars were placed to close the bridge from 10:00 p.m. to 6:00 a.m. and despite the barriers, pedestrians could still access the bridge. Callahan protested to Frederick Black, the chief engineer of the Pennsylvania Bridge Department that he would give them until on March 18, 1940 to open the span to his preference, otherwise he would file a complaint with Lehman. Callahan added that a physician in Shohola was serving as the medical delegate for all residents of Barryville and that with the bridge closed at night, the doctor's inability to drive across the structure at night could risk lives of his residents. He added that the Shohola Fire Department was also the main provider for fire services in Barryville. Callahan also stated that if anyone died due to the closed bridge, he would give people trouble. A week later, the state of Pennsylvania relented and began opening the bridge on a 24 hour basis. Three watchmen would be posted on the bridge for eight hour shifts each to monitor the approaches for any vehicle violating the 6,000-pound (2,700 kg) weight limit. Callahan celebrated his victory over the officials of Pennsylvania. Callahan also stated that construction of the new bridge was to officially begin in June and that the new steel bridge would be moved to the direct center of Barryville, which would inflate local property values on both sides of the Delaware River.

Malcolm Dexter, a member of the Sullivan Board of Supervisor's interstate bridge committee, announced in May 1940 that the opening of bids for a new bridge would come on June 7. The estimate for the new bridge was that it would cost about $350,000 ($7661200 in 2025) to build. The advertisement noted that the new bridge would be 745 feet (227 m) long and 18 feet (5.5 m) wide, made of steel with a new concrete base, along with new stone piers. As part of construction, the elevation on the Shohola side would be raised to eliminate the need for a cut through Shohola to facilitate road construction. It was expected to take at least a year to build the new structure. The Whittaker and Diehl Company of Harrisburg, Pennsylvania attained the winning bid for the new bridge at a cost of $270,291 ($5916400 in 2025) on June 7.

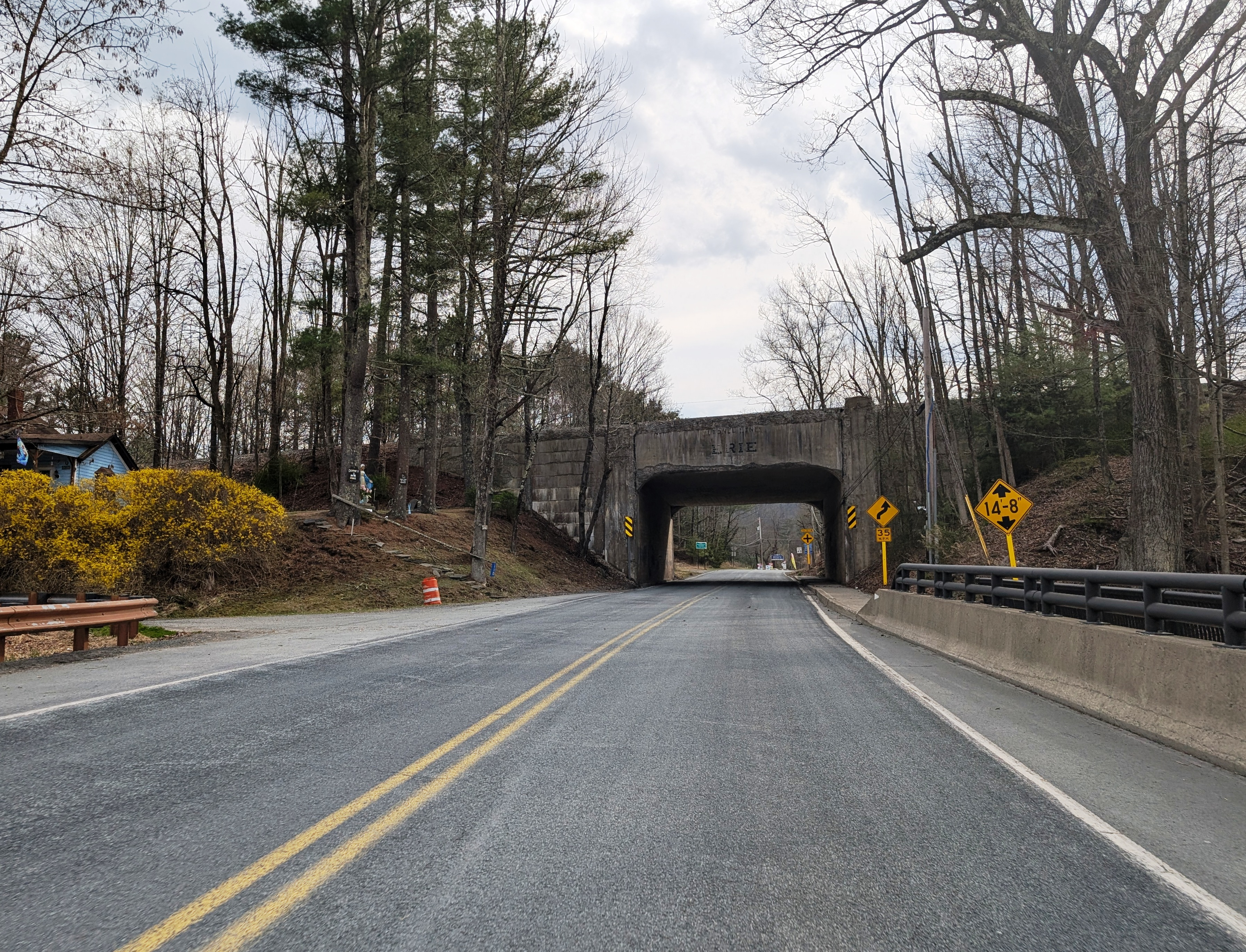
The Erie Railroad bridge in Shohola built as part of the construction of a new alignment of State Route 137

Construction was delayed on July 16 when a judge in Milford, Pennsylvania imposed a temporary injunction on construction due to a complaint by Arthur Rohman, a hotelier at Shohola. Rohman complained that the contractors were using his land for materials due to be used for construction, where a portion of his property had been condemned for future use. Whittaker and Diehl's construction crew had been storing supplies and machinery without approval of Rohman and had been constantly trespassing on the rest of the property. Rohman's attorney added that the crew refused to move him and that if more supplies were added, damage would be done to his property. The judge added that a hearing be held on July 23 to determine what to do with the complaint.

Construction resumed that month after the injunction was lifted. The bridge was well under construction by June 1941, with the shortages in steel not interrupting progress. However, they had issues with acquiring labor to perform construction as many available arms were required for construction on federal contractors for war defense, along with some joining the United States Army. The Erie Railroad also had created a temporary trestle to eliminate a grade crossing on Pennsylvania State Route 137 and soon replaced with a permanent structure. A new 0.75-mile (1.21 km) stretch of Route 137 would also soon be built to facilitate traffic on the new bridge. By the end of June 1941, 0.25 miles (0.40 km) of the new base for the alignment had been placed and the cut was finished. Expectation would be that the new bridge would open by August 1941 in conjunction with the celebration of New York State Route 97.

By early September 1941, the new bridge was complete with the exception of painting. The Route 137 tunnel was complete as well with the grading of the new alignment. Still required for Route 137 was the application of pavement. Speculation was that the new bridge and alignments would be finished by October.

The new bridge opened to traffic on October 6, 1941 at 4:30 p.m. without any fanfare or official ceremonies. The suspension bridge was closed on October 7 at 8:00 a.m.

== Fifth span (2007–present) ==
With the deterioration of the fourth span, the bridge commission and the Pennsylvania Department of Transportation started construction on a $9.38 million (2007 USD ($14,564,500 in 2025)) concrete bridge with steel beams connecting Traffic Route 434 on the Pennsylvania side (assigned in 1967) and Touring Route 55/Sullivan County Route 11 (assigned in 1930). The construction began in February 2004, and since there was no place to perform a groundbreaking ceremony, the construction company hired, Fahs Construction Group of Binghamton, New York performed a "bridge-breaking" ceremony on March 25, 2004, taking sledgehammers to the bridge. The bridge was expected to have resemble the Roebling Aqueduct, which lay to the north in Minisink Ford, New York. The bridge was proposed to be 812 feet (247 m) with twin 12 feet (3.7 m) travel lanes and an 8-foot (2.4 m) shoulder. It was to also have three balconies facing upstream of the Delaware River, to offer travelers scenic views.

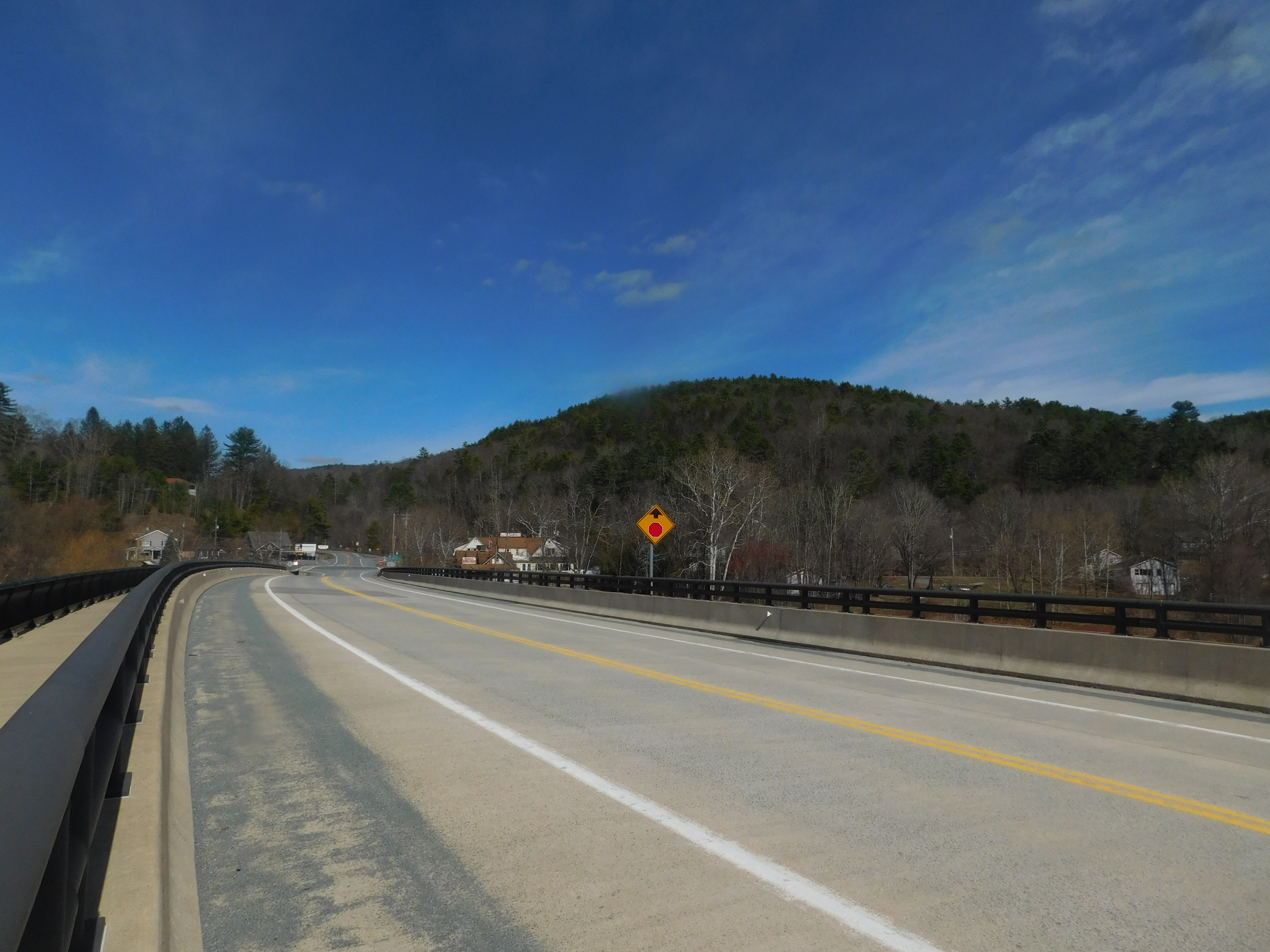
Facing towards New York from the westbound side of the bridge

A number of difficulties and unforeseen circumstances delayed construction. First, the Pennsylvania Historical and Museum Commission had been conducting archaeological digs in the area since 1996, and had found a variety of artifacts dating from the Clovis period, with radio carbon age dating around 10,900 BCE, making them one of the oldest sites in the eastern United States; the sites also includes evidence of food, making it one of the rarer paleolithic finds. The next circumstance was that there was worry that the construction of the bridge might affect the river ecosystem, particularly some of the river water organisms. After some regulations were added and problems were sorted out, the construction continued. The third issue was that the bridge may run into problems with boaters, and therefore, the bridge was given the same regulations as bridges upstream. Finally, the Delaware's low water level meant that barges could not be used in the construction. When Hurricane Ivan struck in 2004, the water level rose, allowing for the use of the barges, but destroying several construction items used for the bridge in the process.

The bridge, which had an estimated completion in the autumn of 2006 according to the Pennsylvania Department of Transportation, was opened on-time on October 26, 2006. This closed the old 1940 structure from use, coned off from Route 434 and Route 55. Once abutment work was finished, the now Fahs-Rolson Construction Company began demolishing the old structure. However, unfinished paving work was completed in October 2007. The total cost for the replacement project came out in 2009 at $11.62 million (2007 USD ($17,438,100 in 2025)).

The bridge had temporary fencing and new walkways along a six-lane span, with locals saying that the stone structure fitting into the looks of the scenic Delaware River Valley. The old bridge was demolished after construction completed.

== See also ==
- List of crossings of the Delaware River
- New York–Pennsylvania Joint Interstate Bridge Commission
