= Chauncey Thomas =

- Born: August 13, 1813; Damascus, Wayne County, Pennsylvania
- Died: October 5, 1882 (aged 69); Shohola Glen, Pike County, Pennsylvania
- Occupations: Farmer and businessman
- Known for: Construction of 4 bridges

Chauncey Thomas (August 13, 1813, in Damascus, Wayne County, Pennsylvania – October 5, 1882, in Shohola Glen, Pike County, Pennsylvania) was businessman and bridge builder, best known for his role in the original construction and multiple reconstructions of the Barryville–Shohola Bridge over the Delaware River, and as the father of Rear Admiral and Commander in Chief of the Pacific Fleet, Chauncey Thomas Jr., USN.

== Life and career ==
Chauncey Thomas was born in Damascus Township, Pennsylvania in 1813. He was one of eleven children born to mill owner and entrepreneur Moses Thomas and his wife, Rebecca Monington. On his father's side of the family, his grandfather Moses Thomas had been killed by Indians near Narrowsburg during the French and Indian War. On his maternal side, the Monington family of Philadelphia had come to the Delaware valley from Gloucester, England, in the early 18th century.

Prior to the construction of the Barryville–Shohola Bridge, a ferry boat linked the two towns. In 1854, the Barryville and Shohola Bridge Company was formed, with Chauncey Thomas was president, to construct a suspension bridge over the Delaware river. Thomas attempted to hire civil engineer John A. Roebling but he was preoccupied with another bridge project New York. Using Roebling's instructions, Thomas constructed the Barryville–Shohola Bridge using local labor. The bridge was 495 feet (151 m) long and 10 feet (3.0 m) wide.

In 1859, it collapsed due to a windstorm. Thomas rebuilt the bridge; however, it collapsed again in 1865. The Barryville and Shohola Bridge Company was unable to rebuild the bridge and soon went out of business. Chauncey Thomas bought the bridge himself and rebuilt it, this time including a center support. This bridge was success and operated until it was replaced by a modern bridge downriver built in 1941.
