= Michael Pearson (author) =

American novelist

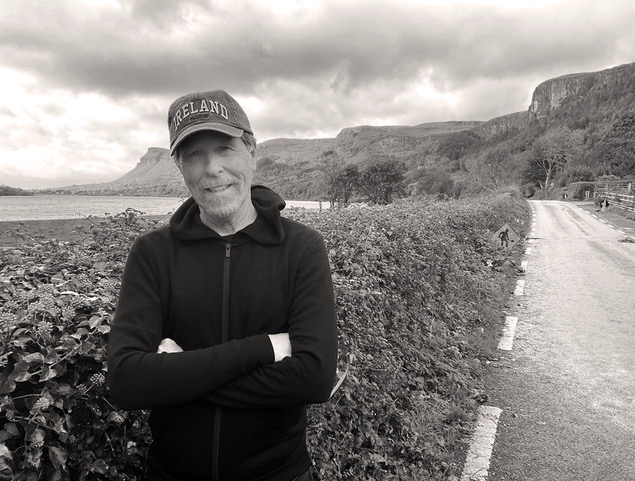
- Born: Michael Patrick Pearson; June 18, 1949 (age 77)
- Education: Fordham University; University of San Francisco; Pennsylvania State University
- Occupation: Writer
- Spouse: JoEllen Pearson (m. 1971)
- Website: michaelpatrickpearson.com

Michael Patrick Pearson (born June 18, 1949) is an American author of hundreds of essays and eight books – a novel, Shohola Falls (2003), and seven works of non-fiction; Imagined Places: Journeys into Literary America (a New York Times Notable Book of 1992), A Place That's Known: Essays (1994), John McPhee (1997), Dreaming of Columbus: A Boyhood in the Bronx (1999), Innocents Abroad Too: Journeys Around the World on Semester at Sea (2008), Reading Life: On Books, Memory and Travel (2015), The Road to Dungannon: Journeys in Literary Ireland (2023). His new nonfiction book—The Road to Croagh Patrick: One Writer's Literary and Spiritual Pilgrimages—will come out from McFarland and Company in 2026.

== Early life ==
Pearson was born and grew up in the Bronx. He went to St. Philip Neri Elementary School, Mount St. Michael High School, and Fordham University. In 1971, after he married Jo-Ellen Kiernan and they moved to California, he received a master's degree from the University of San Francisco. For two years (1972–1974), he taught in a Bronx junior high school. From 1974 to 1977, he studied at the Pennsylvania State University, where he received his doctorate in English and American literature.

He then taught at Auburn University in Alabama, LaGrange College in Georgia, and for 32 years at Old Dominion University in Virginia. From 1997 to 2006, he directed the MFA Program in Creative Writing at Old Dominion University in Norfolk, Virginia. He is currently a full-time writer, working on both nonfiction and fiction projects.

== Bibliography ==
=== Non-fiction books ===
- Imagined Places: Journeys into Literary America. University Press of Mississippi ISBN 978-0815606604. Reprint: Syracuse University Press 1996.
- A Place That’s Known: Essays. University Press of Mississippi 1994. ISBN 978-0878056729.
- John McPhee. Twayne Publishers. 1997. ISBN 978-0805746242.
- Dreaming of Columbus: A Boyhood in the Bronx. Syracuse University Press. 1999. ISBN 978-0815605614.
- Innocents Abroad Too: Journeys Around the World on Semester at Sea. Syracuse University Press 2009 ISBN 978-0815609094.
- Reading Life: On Books, Memory and Travel. Mercer University Press. 2015. ISBN 978-0-88146-542-6.
- The Road to Dungannon: Journeys in Literary Ireland. McFarland & Company 2023. ISBN 978-0-88146-775-8.
- “The Road to Croagh Patrick: One Writer’s Literary and Spiritual Pilgrimages “. McFarland & Company 2026. { {ISBN 978-1476698236} }.

=== Novels ===
- Shohola Falls. Syracuse University Press. 2003. ISBN 978-0815607854.
