= Shohola Glen Hotel =

- U.S. National Register of Historic Places
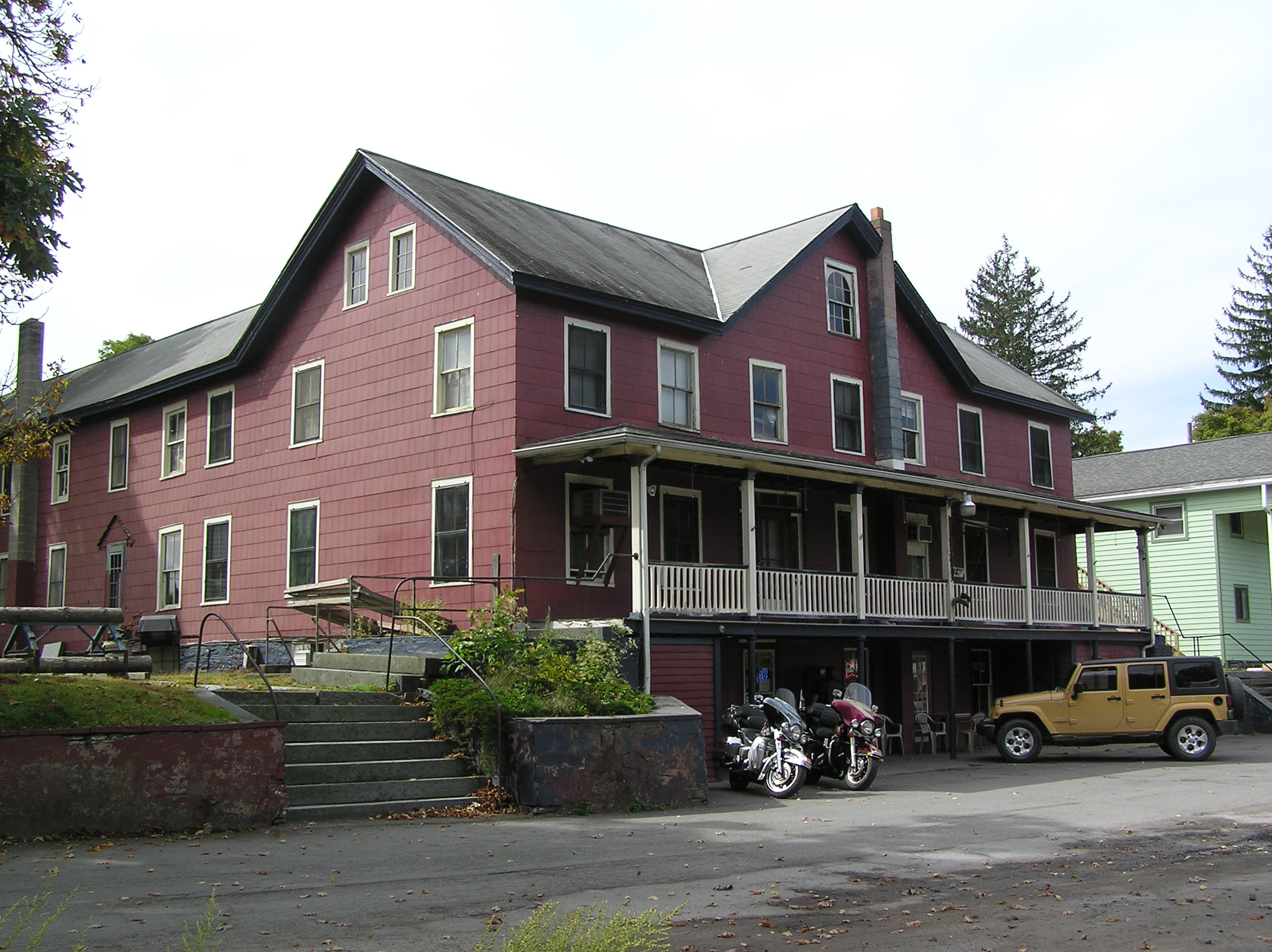

- Location within Pennsylvania Location within the United States
- Location: 100 Rohman Road, Shohola Township, Pennsylvania
- Coordinates: 41°28′29″N 74°54′55″W
- Area: less than one acre
- Built: 1875
- Architectural style: Greek Revival, Gothic Revival
- MPS: Upper Delaware Valley, New York and Pennsylvania MPS
- NRHP reference No.: 97000288
- Added to NRHP: March 28, 1997

Shohola Glen Hotel, also known as Rohman's Inn and Shohola House, is a historic hotel located in Shohola Township, Pike County, Pennsylvania. It was built in 1875, and is a 2 1/2-story, L-shaped, wood-frame, banked building. It is seven bays wide, has a cross-gabled roof, and features a full-width front porch. The building was updated in the 1940s, after a fire, at which time a bowling alley was added.

It was added to the National Register of Historic Places in 1997.
