= Shohola Falls =

2003 novel by Michael Pearson

- Cover to the first edition
- Author: Michael Pearson
- Language: English
- Genre: Novel
- Publisher: Syracuse University Press
- Publication date: September 2003
- Publication place: United States
- Media type: Print (Hardback)
- Pages: 224 pp (hardback edition)
- ISBN: 0-8156-0785-7 (hardback edition)
- OCLC: 52387857
- Dewey Decimal: 813/.6 21
- LC Class: PS3616.E255 S36 2003

Shohola Falls is a 2003 novel written by Michael Pearson, published by Syracuse University Press.

== Plot summary ==
The novel imagines the true story of Thomas Blankenship, the boy that Mark Twain based the character of Huckleberry Finn upon, in his novel Adventures of Huckleberry Finn. In Shohola Falls, Mark Twain is set as an important character, the fictional reality aligned to the historical one.
