= Shohola Township, Pennsylvania =

Township in Pennsylvania, US

Shohola Township
- Township
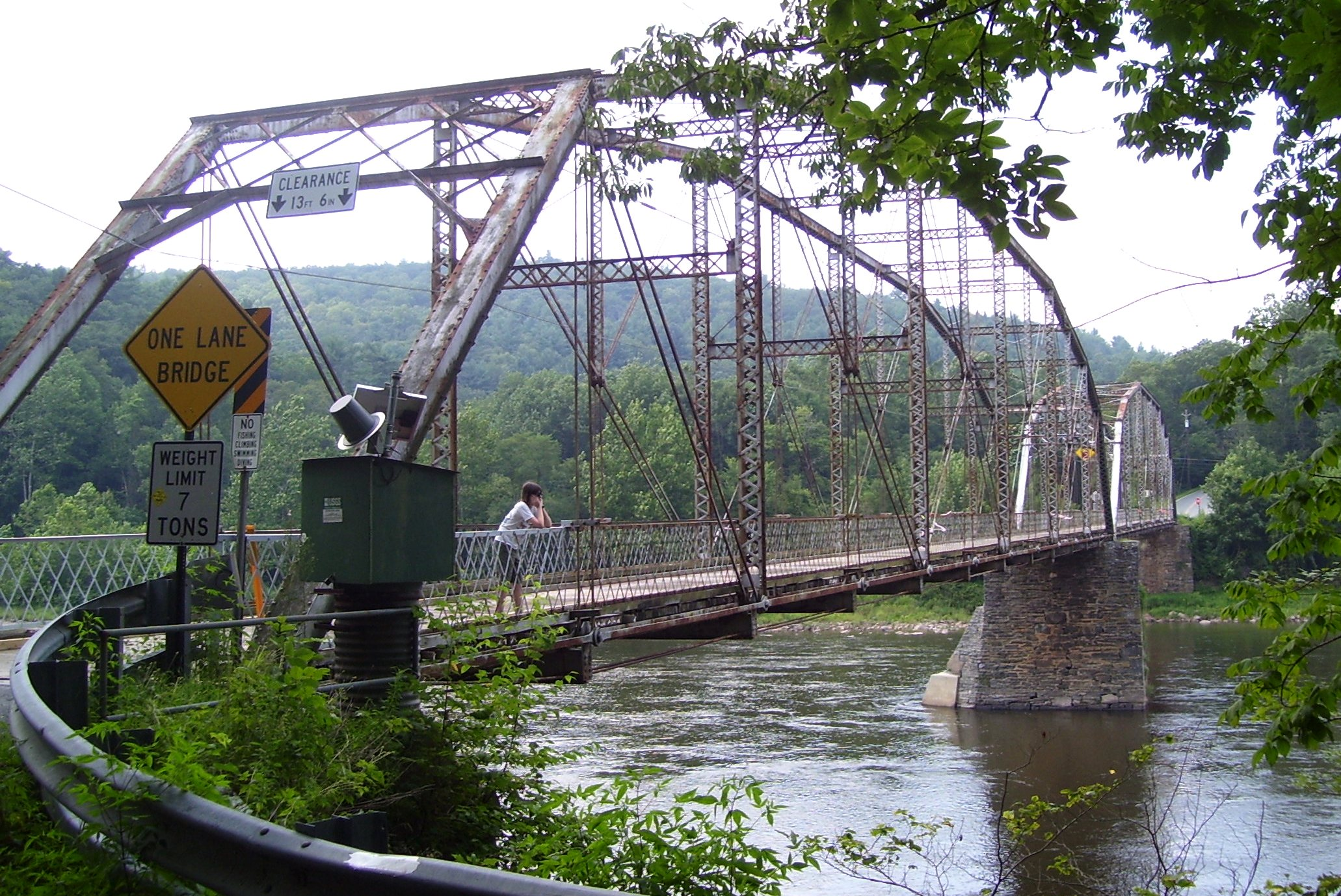
- Pond Eddy Bridge over the Delaware River

- Seal

- Location in Pike County and the state of Pennsylvania.

- Location of Pennsylvania in the United States
- Coordinates: 41°28′30″N 74°54′56″W
- Country: United States
- State: Pennsylvania
- County: Pike

Area
  - Total: 46.70 sq mi (120.95 km^{2})
  - Land: 45.29 sq mi (117.30 km^{2})
  - Water: 1.41 sq mi (3.65 km^{2})
- Elevation: 1,345 ft (410 m)

Population (2010)
  - Total: 2,475
  - Estimate (2016): 2,330
  - Density: 51.4/sq mi (19.86/km^{2})
- Time zone: UTC-5 (EST)
  - Summer (DST): UTC-4 (EDT)
- ZIP Code: 18458
- Area code: 570
- FIPS code: 42-103-70496
- Website: https://shoholatwp.org/

Shohola Township is a township in Pike County, Pennsylvania, United States. The population was 2,088 at the 2000 census.

Shohola is a Native American name meaning "place of peace."

== Geography ==
According to the United States Census Bureau, the township has a total area of 45.9 square miles (118.8 km^{2}), of which 44.6 square miles (115.6 km^{2}) is land and 1.2 square miles (3.2 km^{2}) (2.70%) is water.

== Demographics ==
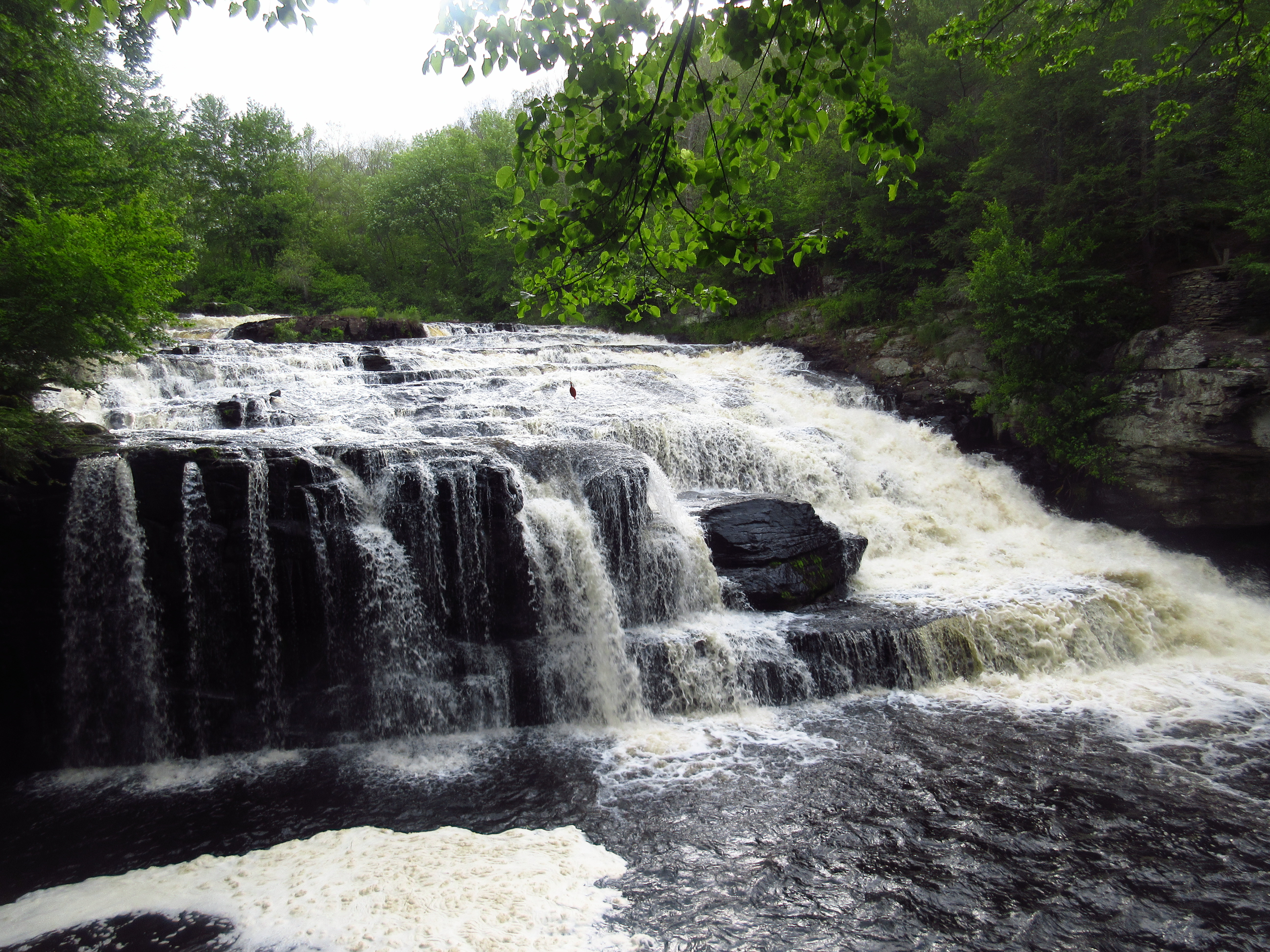
Shohola Falls

Historical population
Census	Pop.	Note	%±
2010	2,475		—
2016 (est.)	2,330		−5.9%
U.S. Decennial Census

As of the census of 2000, there were 2,088 people, 836 households, and 585 families residing in the township. The population density was 46.8 inhabitants per square mile (18.1/km^{2}). There were 3,089 housing units at an average density of 69.2 per square mile (26.7/km^{2}). The racial makeup of the township was 97.99% White, 0.14% African American, 0.10% Native American, 0.34% Asian, 0.86% from other races, and 0.57% from two or more races. 3.64% of the population were Hispanic or Latino of any race.

There were 836 households, out of which 30.5% had children under the age of 18 living with them, 61.6% were married couples living together, 6.7% had a female householder with no husband present, and 30.0% were non-families. 26.2% of all households were made up of individuals, and 10.4% had someone living alone who was 65 years of age or older. The average household size was 2.47 and the average family size was 2.98.

In the township the population was spread out, with 24.4% under the age of 18, 4.3% from 18 to 24, 26.1% from 25 to 44, 27.9% from 45 to 64, and 17.3% who were 65 years of age or older. The median age was 42 years. For every 100 females there were 97.9 males. For every 100 females age 18 and over, there were 99.0 males.

The median income for a household in the township was $41,593, and the median income for a family was $46,207. Males had a median income of $38,080 versus $28,750 for females. The per capita income for the township was $20,840. 6.2% of the population and 4.2% of families were below the poverty line. Out of the total population, 8.5% of those under the age of 18 and 5.9% of those 65 and older were living below the poverty line.

== Shohola Falls Recreation Area ==
Just off U.S. Route 6 in Shohola, is Shohola Falls. The falls are a multi-tier level of falls flowing from Shohola Creek and continuing down the river. An 8.2-mile loop hiking trail is provided for visitors.

== Notable residents ==
- Smoky Joe Wood, baseball pitcher.

== See also ==
- Barryville–Shohola Bridge
- Shohola train wreck
