= Shohola Creek =

- Etymology: Lenape for "meek or faint"

Location
- Country: United States
- State: Pennsylvania
- Region: Pocono Mountains

Physical characteristics
- Source: Pocono Plateau
- Mouth: Delaware River
  - location: Near Shohola, Pennsylvania
  - coordinates: 41.43230°N 74.94667°W
- Length: 29.0 m (95.1 ft)

Basin features
- River system: Delaware River basin

Shohola Creek is a 29.0-mile-long (46.7 km) tributary of the Delaware River in the Pocono Mountains in Northeastern Pennsylvania.

Shohola Creek (Lenape for "meek or faint") drops off the Pocono Plateau and joins the Delaware River approximately 17 miles (27 km) upstream of Port Jervis, New York.

== See also ==
- List of Pennsylvania rivers
