= List of New York State Historic Markers in Orange County, New York =

This is an incomplete list of New York State Historic Markers in Orange County, New York.

== Listings county-wide ==
	Marker name	Image	Date designated	Location	City or Town	Marker text
1	BUTTER FACTORY		1956	Route 207 and Erie Street	Campbell Hall, New York	First in U.S. - 1856, [directional arrow] 200 feet, H.W. Woodhull, owner, George Gouge, buttermaker. HMDb #183582
2	FIRST CONGREGATIONAL CHURCH		1935	35 East Main Street	Middletown, New York	Organized Jun 10, 1785, First and only church in vicinity for 40 years, third edifice erected here 1872. HMDb #47897
3	N. J. LINE WAR		1938	U.S. 209 at Huguenot	Deerpark, New York	Major Jacobus Swartwout, leader of N. Y. faction, settled here about 1741 and was later kidnapped by Jersey men
4	N. J. LINE WAR		1996	U.S. 209 south of Godeffroy	Deerpark, New York	Land of Westfall & Co. was settled on Jersey claim 1698. Attacked by armed New Yorkers from Goshen and Peenpack, 1701–1759 HMDb #193887
5	N. J. CLAIM LINE		1936	U.S. 209 halfway between Huguenot and Port Jervis	Deerpark, New York	State Line as claimed by New Jersey, 1686–1769, 7 miles north of present line at Port Jervis, N. Y., caused 50 year border war
6	N. J. LINE WAR		1936	Neversink Drive, east of Port Jervis	Deerpark, New York	Hendrick Decker and his brother, Jan, settled here about 1698. Headquarters of N. J. Line Commissioners and Surveyors, 1719
7	INDIAN RAID		1936	South Maple Street	Port Jervis, New York	House and barn of Simon Westfall on this site, burned by Brant's Mohawks and Tories, July 20, 1779
8	WILLIAM H. SEWARD		1935	Main Street	Florida, New York	1801-1872 Was born on this site in house now used as a barn in the rear.
9	NEVERSINK DRIVE (HORN ROAD)		1935	Neversink Drive, east of Port Jervis	Deerpark, New York	Along this old road are scenes of events in the raid by the Mohawk Chief, Joseph Brant, July 20, 1779
10	CAMP SITE		1935	Neversink Drive, about 2 miles northeast of Port Jervis	Deerpark, New York	Second N. Y. Regiment, on way to Stroudsburg, May 7, 1779 to build road to Wyoming for Sullivan's March against Indians
11	DECKER FORT		2011	Neversink Drive, about 2 1/2 miles northeast of Port Jervis	Deerpark, New York	Major Decker's stockaded house on this site burned by Brant's raiders, July 20, 1779. Militia pursuing Brant rallied here
12	PAINTED APRONS		2015	Neversink Drive	Deerpark, New York	Black Rock school attacked in by Brant's raiders, 1779. Girls spared as aprons marked with emblem signaling raiders not to harm them. Erected by New York Folklore Society William C. Pomeroy Foundation.
13	INDIAN RAID		1935	Neversink Drive, about 2 miles east of Port Jervis	Deerpark, New York	School here was burned by raiders, July 20, 1779. Teacher scalped, boys made prisoners, girls saved by Brant's mark on aprons
14	INDIAN VILLAGE		1935	Neversink Drive	Deerpark, New York	On the plateau to the west stood the Indian village Oquekumsey. Abandoned 1730, excavated by N.Y. State Museum, 1909.
15	INDIAN RAID		1935	Neversink Drive	Deerpark, New York	Anthony Van Etten built a smithy here about 1756. James Swartwout hid in flue during raid of 1779 thus keeping his scalp.
16	SITE OF		1935	Neversink Drive	Deerpark, New York	Fort Van Auken Unsuccessfully attacked by Mohawks and Tories led by Joseph Brant in raid on this valley, July 20, 1779
17	INDIAN RAID		1935	Neversink Drive	Deerpark, New York	House & Barn of Jacobus Van Fleet on this site burned by Brant's raiders July 20, 1779
18	INDIAN RAID		1935	Neversink Drive	Deerpark, New York	Solomon Kuykendall, ESQ. Justice of the peace 1771-1787, Home burned by Brant's Mohawk and Tories, July 20, 1779
19	INDIAN RAID		1936	US 209 about 1/2 mile south of Cuddebackville	Deerpark, New York	Route taken by N. Y. and N. J. militia in pursuit of Col. Brant for raid on Minisink (Port Jervis) July 21, 1779
20	1892 LYNCHING		2022	US 6 in Port Jervis	Port Jervis, New York	On June 2 Robert Lewis, a local black resident, was mob lynched near this site. No one was held accountable for his murder.
21	THE CRANE HOUSE		1984	U.S. 6 in Port Jervis	Port Jervis, New York	The home of Judge William Crane from 1890-1901. His brother Stephen Crane visited from 1891-1896 creating some of his finest works.
22	MARION ROHNER		2001	U.S. 209 in Port Jervis	Port Jervis, New York	Mrs. Rohner, Den Mother of Den 1, Pack 173, Holds the Guinness World Record for longest serving Den Mother in the world. 43 years-2001
23	OLDEST CHURCH		1935	U.S. 6 and 209 in Port Jervis	Port Jervis, New York	Organized in 1737 and formed by early Dutch Settlers. It is the oldest congregation in the area. Present edifice built in 1868.
24	INDIAN RAID		1936	U.S. 6 in Port Jervis	Port Jervis, New York	Maghaghkamik Church, built 1743 on this site, was burned in raid by Joseph Brant's Mohawks and Tories, July 20, 1779
25	COLE'S FORT		1935	U.S. 6 in Port Jervis	Port Jervis, New York	Built 1755, in French and Indian War, by New Jersey which claimed this area. Home of Wilhelmus Coe settled here about 1730.
26	FIRST MILL		1936	Beach Rd. in Port Jervis	Port Jervis, New York	Before 1713, a Grist Mill was built where this road crosses the brook, by Stephen Tietsoort, son of William, First Settler
27	KAATSBAAN		1936	U.S. 209 in Deerpark	Deerpark, New York	(Dutch for Tennis Court) Site of Indian Football Field in bend of river home of William Tietsoort 1690-1713
28	HUGUENOT		1936	U.S. 209 in Deerpark	Deerpark, New York	Named for Huguenot Families Cuddeback and Gumaer, Who settled here about 1698. Indian name Seneyaugnquan.
29	HUGUENOT SCHOOL		1936	Grange Rd. in Deerpark	Deerpark, New York	A typical one room school built in 1863 overlooking the D&H Canal using bricks made of clay native to the Neversink Valley
30	INDIAN RAID		1936	Peenpack Trail in Deerpark	Deerpark, New York	Route by which Col. Brant and his Mohawk and Tory Raiders descended on this valley October 13, 1778 and July 20, 1779
31	FIRST SETTLER		1936	U.S. 209 in Deerpark	Deerpark, New York	About 1690 William Tietsoort set up a Blacksmith Shop here at the request of Indians who gave him this land west of their village
32	HAWK'S NEST		2002	Route 97 in Deerpark	Deerpark, New York	1859- One lane dirt road 1931- 1933 Road was paved 1939- Official Dedication Sept. 21, 2002- Dedication Upper Delaware Scenic Byway

== See also ==
- List of New York State Historic Markers
- National Register of Historic Places listings in New York
- List of National Historic Landmarks in New York
