= List of dam removals in New York =

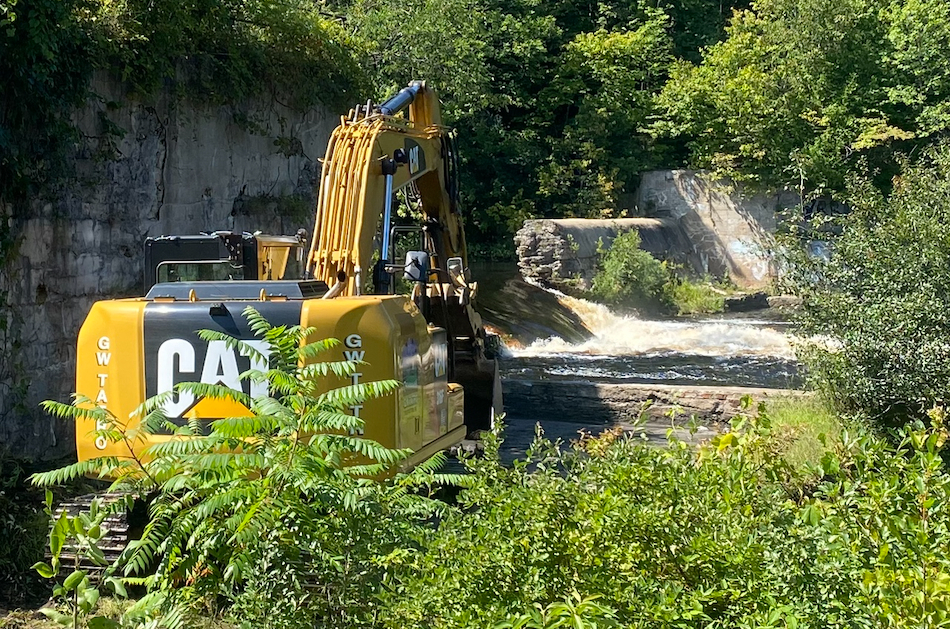
The 2023 demolition of the Indian Rapids Dam on the Saranac River in Plattsburgh.

This is a list of dams in New York that have been removed as physical impediments to free-flowing rivers or streams.

== Removals by watershed ==
=== Delaware River ===
The 6-foot (1.8 m) tall Cuddebackville Dam on the Neversink River, a tributary of the Delaware River, was built in two portions dating from the 1820s (for water diversion into a canal) and 1915 (for hydroelectric power). The dam had been abandoned since 1945, and was removed in October 2004 by the U.S. Army Corps of Engineers in a novel partnership with the Nature Conservancy. The removal benefited aquatic life in the area, specifically the Dwarf Wedge Mussel and the American Shad. The dam was said to be the first in New York to be removed solely for environmental reasons.

=== Saranac River ===
In 2023 two dams were removed from the lower Saranac River in Plattsburgh: Indian Rapids Dam and Fredenburgh Falls Dam. Funding to support the project flowed from multiple streams: $536,000 from Patriot Hydro, $175,000 from the U.S Fish and Wildlife Service, $65,000 from New York State Electric and Gas, and $370,000 from the Lake Champlain Basin Program (made possibly by the Infrastructure Investment and Jobs Act, signed into law by President Biden in 2021).

== Completed removals ==
| Dam | Height | Year removed | Location | Watercourse | Watershed |
|---|---|---|---|---|---|
| Chubb River Dam | 10 ft (3.0 m) | 2013 | Lake Placid; 44.2794°N 73.9803°W | Chubb River | Ausable River |
| Lake Placid Village Dam | 19 ft (5.8 m) | 2014 | Lake Placid; 44.2753°N 73.9784°W | Chubb River | Ausable River |
| Ausable Quarry Dam (Notch House Dam) | 3 ft (0.91 m) (est.) | 2016 | Lake Placid; 44.3039°N 73.9242°W | West Branch Ausable River | Ausable River |
| Rome Dam | 37 ft (11 m) | 2018 | Au Sable Forks; 44.44°N 73.7055°W | West Branch Ausable River | Ausable River |
| Saw Mill Dam | 9 ft (2.7 m) | 2015 | Willsboro; 44.3664°N 73.3914°W | Boquet River | Boquet River |
| Crowningshield Dam | 7 ft (2.1 m) | 2008 | Lewis, Essex County; 44.3303°N 73.5467°W | North Branch Boquet River | Boquet River |
| Cold Brook Dam | 4 ft (1.2 m) | 2022 | Willsboro; 44.3247°N 73.4773°W | Cold Brook | Boquet River |
| American Legion Pool Dam | 4 ft (1.2 m) | 2007 | Norwich; 42.5344°N 75.5351°W | Canasawacta Creek | Chenango River |
| Earl's Pond Dam | 15 ft (4.6 m) | 2011 | Madison County; 42.8555°N 75.6633°W | Eaton Brook | Chenango River |
| Oriskany Falls Dam | 15 ft (4.6 m) | 2018 | Oriskany; 42.9211°N 75.4797°W | Tributary to Oriskany Creek | Chenango River |
| Luxton Lake Dam | | 1983 | Tusten; 41.59°N 75.0117°W | Tenmile River | Delaware River |
| Cuddebackville Dam | 5 ft (1.5 m) | 2004 | Godeffroy; 41.4685°N 74.6131°W | Neversink River | Delaware River |
| Bear Brook Lower Dam | | 2020 | Delaware; 41.967°N 75.293°W | Bear Brook | Delaware River |
| Lower Little Pond Dam | | 2008 | Andes; 42.0369°N 74.7428°W | Tributary to Beaver Kill | Delaware River |
| Pike Dam | | 2021 | Pike; 42.5566°N 78.155°W | Wiscoy Creek | Genesee River |
| Fort Edward Dam | 31 ft (9.4 m) | 1973 | Fort Edward; 43.2684°N 73.5967°W | Hudson River | Hudson River |
| Breakneck Brook Dam | 18 ft (5.5 m) | 2011 | Putnam County; 41.4488°N 73.9628°W | Breakneck Brook | Hudson River |
| Shapp Pond Dam | 12 ft (3.7 m) | 2016 | Dutchess County; 41.8125°N 73.7589°W | East Branch Wappinger Creek | Hudson River |
| Furnace Brook Barrier #1 | 4.75 ft (1.45 m) | 2020 | Cortlandt; 41.2307°N 73.9185°W | Furnace Brook | Hudson River |
| May's Field Dam | 6 ft (1.8 m) | 2020 | Washingtonville; 41.4265°N 74.1634°W | Moodna Creek | Hudson River |
| Curry Pond Dam | 3 ft (0.91 m) | | Garrison; 41.3441°N 73.9437°W | Tributary to Hudson River | Hudson River |
| Strook's Felt Factory Dam | 4 ft (1.2 m) | 2020 | Newburgh; 41.4908°N 74.0176°W | Quassaic Creek | Hudson River |
| Nicholson Road Dam | | 2019 | East Fishkill; 41.5281°N 73.6871°W | Tributary to Stump Pond Stream | Hudson River |
| Lower Chia Lin Dam | | 2021 | Stormville; 41.5316°N 73.7243°W | Leetown Brook | Hudson River |
| Wynantskill Dam (Hudson Valley Fuel Dam) | | 2016 | Troy; 42.7053°N 73.6989°W | Wynants Kill | Hudson River |
| William Miaski Dam | 13.5 ft (4.1 m) | 2010 | Stephentown; 42.535°N 73.4183°W | Tributary to Kinderhook Creek | Hudson River |
| Jansen Road Dam | 20.5 ft (6.2 m) | 2011 | New Paltz; 41.7281°N 74.0989°W | Tributary to Wallkill River | Hudson River |
| LaSalle Dam | 40 ft (12 m) | 2010 | Altona; 44.8799°N 73.6563°W | Great Chazy River | Lake Champlain |
| Petro Dam (Lower Mill Brook Dam) | | 2015 | Moriah; 44.0487°N 73.4747°W | Mill Brook | Lake Champlain |
| Smith Mills Dam | 19 ft (5.8 m) | 2020 | Chautauqua County; 42.5037°N 79.1035°W | Silver Creek | Lake Erie |
| Harrison's Pond Dam | | 2010 | Kings Park; 40.8936°N 73.2281°W | Tributary to Nissequogue River | Long Island Sound |
| New Mill Pond Dam | 15 ft | 2024 | Smithtown 40.8428 N 73.2281 W | Northeast Branch of Nissequogue River | Long Island Sound |
| Gray Reservoir Dam | 34 ft (10 m) | 2002 | Cold Brook; 43.2547°N 74.9276°W | Black Creek | Mohawk River |
| Remington Arms Company Dam (English Street Dam) | 13 ft (4.0 m) | 2020 | Ilion; 43.0072°N 75.0412°W | Steele Creek | Mohawk River |
| Upper Crown Mill Dam | | 2008 | Marcellus; 42.9849°N 76.3361°W | Ninemile Creek | Oswego River |
| Gaynor Dam (The State Dam) | | 2012 | Fayetteville; 43.0324°N 76.0139°W | Limestone Creek | Oswego River |
| M Seeman Dam | 40 ft (12 m) | 2012 | Pompey; 42.9353°N 75.9628°W | West Branch of Limestone Creek | Oswego River |
| Hillburn Reservoir Dam | 22 ft (6.7 m) | 2012 | Hillburn; 41.1258°N 74.1834°W | Tributary to Ramapo River | Passaic River |
| Eagle Lake Dam | 10 ft (3.0 m) | 2012 | Tuxedo; 41.1532°N 74.2381°W | Tributary to Summit Brook | Passaic River |
| Fort Covington Dam | 10 ft (3.0 m) | 2009 | Fort Covington; 44.9897°N 74.496°W | Salmon River | Salmon River |
| Indian Rapids Dam | 8 ft (2.4 m) | 2023 | Plattsburgh; 44.6750°N 73.4879°W | Saranac River | Saranac River |
| Fredenburgh Falls Dam | | 2023 | Plattsburgh; 44.6692°N 73.4940°W | Saranac River | Saranac River |
| Hogansburg Dam | 12 ft (3.7 m) | 2016 | Hogansburg; 44.9742°N 74.6652°W | St. Regis River | St. Regis River |
| Fowler Finch Dam | 16 ft (4.9 m) | 2011 | North Franklin; 42.3108°N 75.2384°W | Tributary to Carrs Creek | Susquehanna River |
| Chenango 7 Wildlife Pond Dam | 8 ft (2.4 m) | 2015 | Bainbridge; 42.3638°N 75.5379°W | Tributary to Kelsey Creek | Susquehanna River |
| Sidney Reservoir Dam | 20 ft (6.1 m) | 2018 | Bainbridge; 42.3297°N 75.4247°W | Peckham Brook | Susquehanna River |
| Broome Corporate Park Pond Dam #1 | 14 ft (4.3 m) | 2011 | Conklin; 42.0403°N 75.8092°W | Tributary to Susquehanna River | Susquehanna River |
| West Winfield Dam | 10 ft (3.0 m) | 2011 | Winfield; 42.8821°N 75.191°W | Unadilla River | Susquehanna River |
| Karpel Dam | 14 ft (4.3 m) | 2012 | Tioga County; 42.1241°N 76.3472°W | Tributary to Pipe Creek | Susquehanna River |
