= Neversink Preserve =

Protected natural area in New York, US

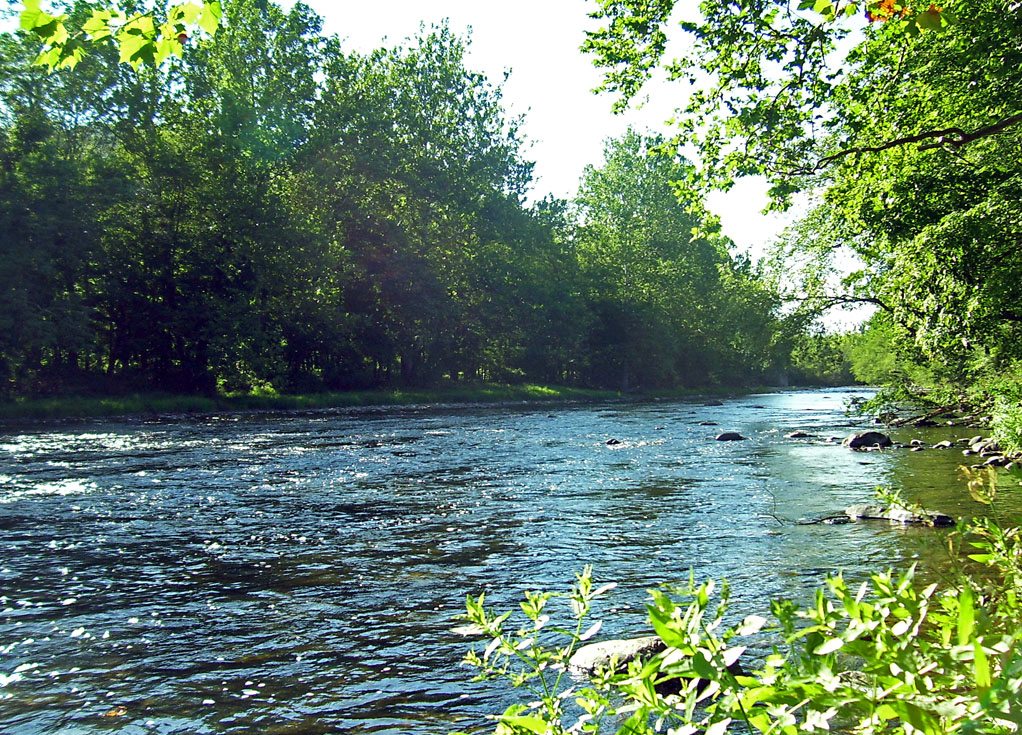
- Neversink River at Cuddebackville

- Location within New York
- Location: Deerpark, Orange County, New York
- Coordinates: 41°25′24″N 74°37′16″W
- Area: 550 acres (220 ha)
- Established: 1993
- Website: Official website

The Neversink Preserve is located in Deerpark, Orange County, New York. It was created in 1993 by The Nature Conservancy. They purchased 170 acres (69 ha) of land on the Neversink River and created the Neversink Preserve in order to protect the newly discovered and federally endangered species of mussel, the dwarf wedge mussel. Over time they have purchased more land so that the Neversink Preserve covers 550 acres (220 ha). Theodore Gordon, considered the father of modern American fly-fishing, perfected his dry-fly techniques here in the 19th century. Nearly 15 million people rely on the waters of the Delaware River Basin for drinking water and industrial use, making the Neversink Preserve a top priority of The Nature Conservancy.

== Flora ==
=== Trees ===
- Sugar maple
- Red maple
- River birch
- Sycamore
- Red oak
- Green ash

=== Wildflowers ===
- Bee balm
- Cardinal flower
- Dutchman's breeches
- Blue flag
- Closed gentians
- Trout lily
- Violet

== Fauna ==
=== Mammals ===
- Otters and beavers live in the creeks and wetlands that crisscross the preserve.
- Bobcats, black bear and wild turkeys inhabit the forests and meadows.

=== Birds ===
- Common merganser
- Wood duck
- Osprey
- Great blue heron
- Belted kingfisher
- Bald eagle
- Ruffed grouse
- Northern harrier
- Owl
- Warbler

=== Fish ===
- Brook trout
- American shad
- Sea lamprey
- American eel

=== Reptiles and amphibians ===
- Spotted salamander
- Wood frog
- Northern water snake
- Ribbon snake
- Snapping turtle

== See also ==
- Cuddebackville Dam
- Protected areas of the United States
- List of New York state parks
- International Union for Conservation of Nature
- Nature conservation
