= Huguenot, New York =

Huguenot, New York may refer to:

- Huguenot, Orange County, New York, a hamlet in the town of Deerpark
- Huguenot, Staten Island, a neighborhood in Staten Island
