= Jevrem =

Serbian Nu Disco producer and DJ, currently based in Minnesota, United States

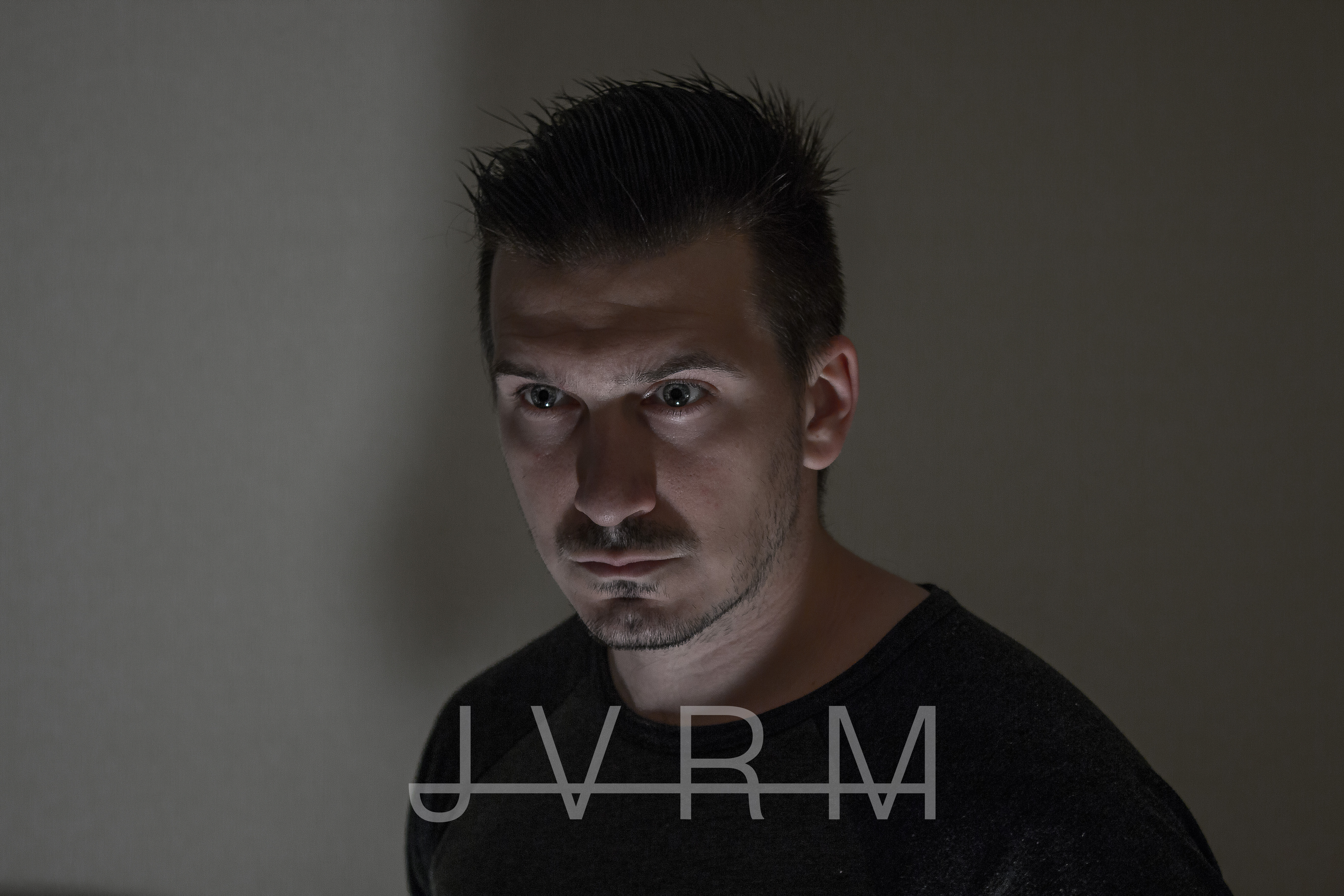
- Jevrem in 2016

Background information
- Also known as: Ducer, Gliese581
- Born: Dusan Jevremovic; 7 November 1988 (age 37); Kragujevac, Serbia
- Genres: Nu disco, electro house, techno
- Occupations: Musical producer, DJ
- Years active: 2003–present
- Labels: Adriatiko Recordings; Sutra Recordings; Hardisco Records
- Website: djevrem.com

Dusan Jevremovic, better known as Jevrem (born 7 November 1988 in Kragujevac, Serbia) is a Serbian Nu Disco producer and DJ, currently based in Minnesota, United States.

== Career ==
He started his career as a DJ and a Producer at an early age of 14, although his creativity was showing ever since he was a toddler. His first teen project called Ducer was oriented towards experimenting with multiple genres of electronic music such as Electro & Techno. During this time (Age 11-16) he was practicing music production as well as his musical skills, learning different instruments (keyboards, guitar, bass). Further, under the alias of Gliese581, he started a unique project mixing Ambient and Techno. Realizing that Techno had a big role in the development of this sound, he was making exclusively Futuristic-Tech tunes. Finally, he settled as Jevrem, maturing with his sound and production capability. This alias presents best of both worlds: the underground and commercial aspect of music production, which comes as the most suitable for constant publishing. He was playing at major festivals in Serbia (Exit, Ru:Foam Fest) and clubs (Soda, Kragujevac, Serbia; UMK Club, Kragujevac, Serbia; Brankow, Belgrade, Serbia; Dom Omladine, Belgrade, Serbia; Feedback, Nish, Serbia; Kriterion, Sarajevo, Bosnia & Herzegovina; Red Carpet, St. Cloud, MN) alone or back to back with his fellow DJ & Producer Caligari. You can find him at the Red Bull Stage in Red Carpet, St. Cloud regularly, where he mixes his all-time favorites with latest modern tunes.

== Selected discography ==
As an artist Jevrem has released two EPs.

- White Mice (2016)
- 500 Light Years (2013)
