= Port Orange, New York =

Port Orange
- Hamlet
- Interactive map of Port Orange
- Coordinates: 41.487°N 74.575°W
- Country: United States of America
- State: New York
- County: Orange County
- Town: Deerpark

Port Orange is a hamlet in Deerpark, Orange County, New York, United States.
