= New York City's YMCA Camp =

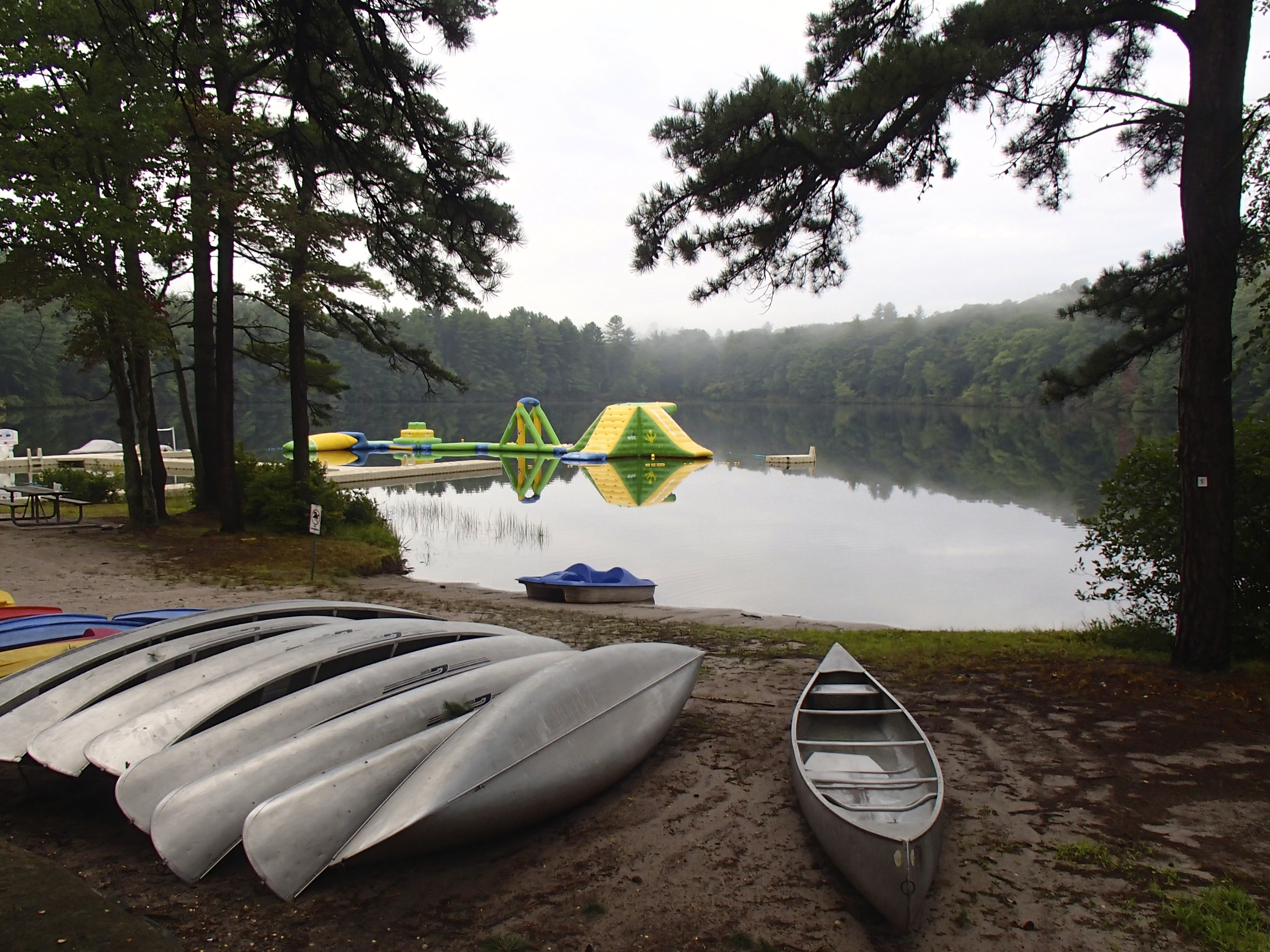
- Lake Talcott (2014)
- Location: Huguenot, New York
- Campsites: 3
- Operated by: YMCA of Greater New York
- Established: 1918
- Closed: 2021

The New York City's YMCA Camp is a former recreational and educational overnight camp in Huguenot, New York that belonged to the YMCA of Greater New York. While the YMCA operates day camps in the five boroughs of New York City, the Huguenot Camp was the only overnight camp of the YMCA of New York City. The camp was created in 1918.

The camp operated for 101 years. Following complications from the COVID-19 pandemic, the camp ceased regular operations in March 2020 and did not offer any summer camp programming that year. In March 2021, the YMCA of Greater New York announced that the camp would be closed permanently and sold. The sale happened later that year.

== Layouts ==
The camp was located in a mostly wooded area encompassing about 1,100 acres in the western part of Huguenot. It contained three lakes; each lake had its eponymous camp,- Camp Talcott, Camp McAlister, and Camp Greenkill. While Camp Talcott and McAllister were summer camps, the facilities at Greenkill had been winterized.

=== Greenkill ===
Greenkill was the primary facility of the New York YMCA camp. Greenkill was home to the Greenkill Outdoor Education and Retreats Center, operating primarily out of the Mary French Rockefeller building on site. Greenkill was also home to the business office, high ropes adventure courses, and a large Gymnasium complex referred to as the "Field House". Finally, Greenkill was also the site of the Summer Day Camp Program.

At the time of its closing, Greenkill was host to 6 Dormitory buildings in which school field trips and retreat groups would be housed for the duration of their stay. The 6 were named Tall Pines, Laurel, Evergreen, Rocky Top, Kleinstuber, and Hemlock. Kleinstuber was named after a man who had lived in proximity to the YMCA and had donated his home and 50 acres of land to the YMCA after his death. Evergreen was the newest of the dorms, and had been built with many eco-friendly innovations with the intent of being a living educational piece.

The Outdoor Education and Retreats Center had a year-round staff of naturalists who delivered all lessons and ran all programs throughout the year. Naturalists were given a group of about 8 to 15 students, depending on the age, and lead them through multiple lessons and programs through their stay. A poplar program amongst schools were "cookout days" that typically involved hiking with kids all day from around 9:30 am to 4:30 pm, teaching them lessons within the woods themselves and cooking their lunches over an open fire they built themselves.

Greenkill was also host to "Lake Marling", a man-made lake that sat within view of the dining hall and all the dorms.

=== McAlister ===
Camp McAlister was the second of the three camps and sat directly in-between the two of them along the road. Camp McAlister was built significantly more into the woods than the other two camps, and was typically darker and cooler in the summers as a result.

In its final year of operation, McAlister's cabins were split between a "Boys Village" and a "Girls village" with the waterfront, main office, and dining hall all in the middle. McAlister also had a large Athletic Field, Basketball Court, and an assembly area overlooking the lake known as "Chapel".

Lake McAlister was the lake on this camp, and like Greenkills lake, was man made. As of 2024, the dam that created Lake McAlister had been condemned, and the Lake itself will be drained overtime.

McAlister specifically served the younger overnight campers, ranging from 6 to 11 years old.

=== Talcott ===
Camp Talcott was the final of the three Camps, at the end of the main road. Unlike the other two camps, Talcott was built directly surrounding its lake, erroneously named "Sand Pond", which was also the only natural lake on the Camp Grounds. One side of the lake represented the Girls Village and the other the Boys Village. In between were the health center and dining hall, while the main office and waterfront were in the girls village itself. The Boys village held the Athletic Field and Chapel.

Talcott was the older of the two camps, housing kids 11 to 16. It was also home to both the Leaders in Training and Bold Gold Programs.

== Operations ==
During the summer, the camp was a temporary home for about 1,200 -1,400 young people each season. For the local community, a day camp was created for the summer. In 2010, after the earthquake in Haiti, a group of Haitian children was sent to the camp to recover from the trauma.

Campers were 7–16 years old and most came from NYC. A majority of campers received financial aid. Activities included social interactions of camp life and provided opportunities to participate in swimming, canoeing, archery, arts and crafts, field games, hiking, and more. Campers were supported by staff members. During summer, counselors and additional staff came from many different countries. After the summer, Camps Talcott and McAlister were closed, while Camp Greenkill remained open for meetings and retreats.

== 2021 Closure and Sale ==
After more than a century of operation during which time, by one estimate, more than 100,000 young people experienced camp life, the YMCA of Greater New York announced its decision to sell the property in March 2021, citing overall losses in excess of $100 million due to the corona virus pandemic. The decision came as a surprise to the Camp's Board of Managers who were not consulted. Former campers, staff members, and alumni rallied to save the camp.

In August 2021, it was announced that the Wend Collective had bought the camp with the intent to reach out to "the communities that historically attended the camps, the communities in which the camps are located, and the broader youth camp sector" and to continue to serve disadvantaged youth.

The camp was renamed "Camp Reimagined" and started to offer some activities in 2023. In Fall 2024, the Wend Collective closed down and Camp Reimagined ceased operations by the end of December.
