= 5 West 63rd Street =

Building in Manhattan, New York

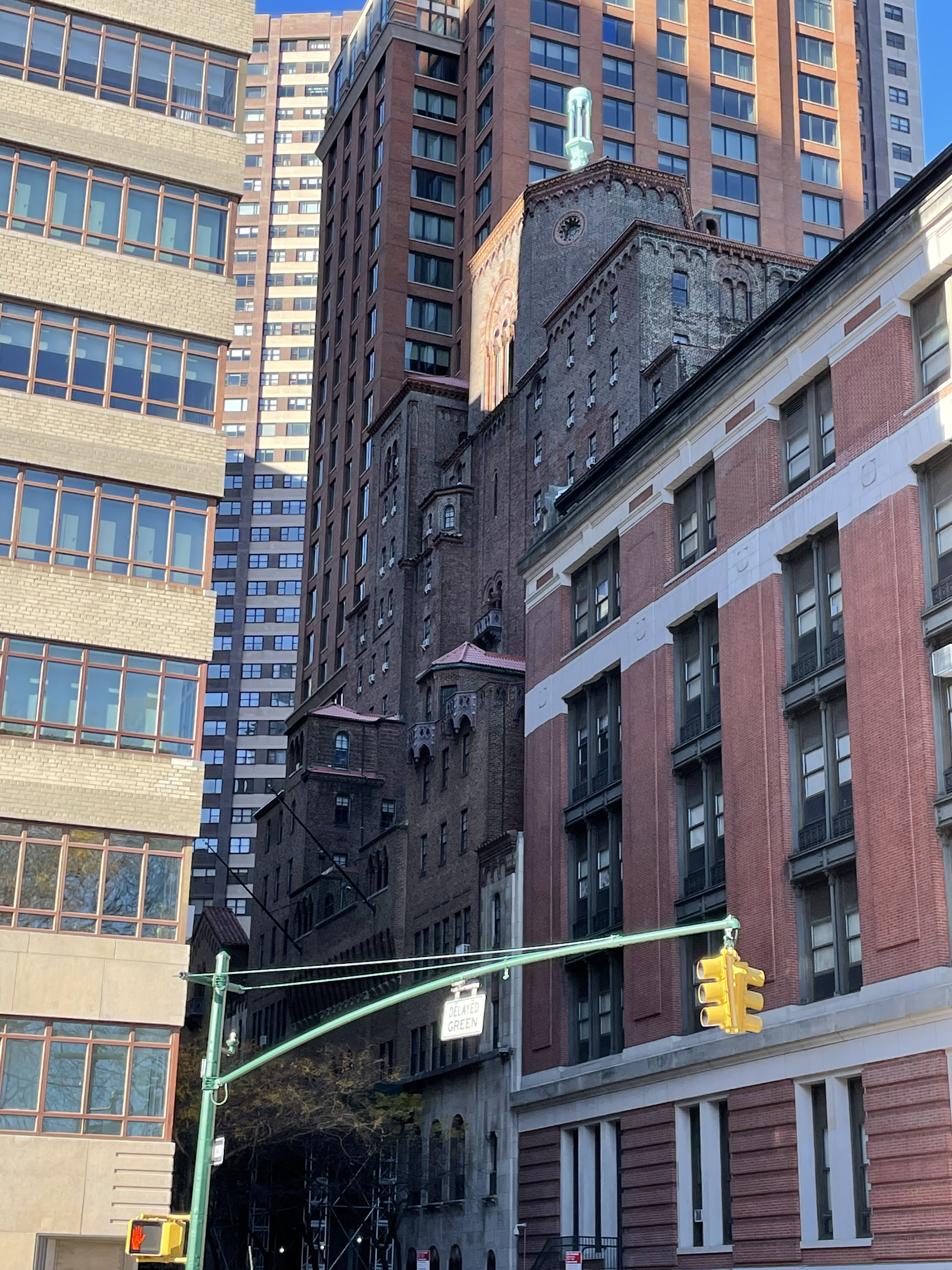
- The building is the dark brown one in this view from the edge of Central Park
- Interactive map of the 5 West 63rd Street area

General information
- Architectural style: Neo-Romanesque
- Location: 5 West 63rd Street, New York City, New York, United States
- Coordinates: 40.7709390°N 73.98060722°W
- Current tenants: YMCA
- Construction started: 1928
- Completed: 1930 (96 years ago)

Technical details
- Floor count: 14

Design and construction
- Architect: Dwight James Baum

5 West 63rd Street is a 14-story building in the Upper West Side neighborhood of Manhattan in New York City, on 63rd Street near the western edge of Central Park. It is part of the Central Park West Historic District. Completed in 1930 and designed by Dwight James Baum, it is the home of the West Side YMCA. It is constructed in brick, limestone and terra cotta, with a steel frame.

The site was formerly occupied by seven 5-story brick rowhouses at 3–11 West 63rd Street and 8–12 West 64th Street.

A rendering of the building, released by Baum's office around 1929
