= Cuddebackville Dam =

Former dam in Orange County, New York, U.S.

Coordinates: 41°28′08″N 074°36′47″W

- Interactive map of Cuddebackville Dam
- Country: United States
- Location: Deerpark, Orange County, New York
- Status: Demolished
- Demolition date: 2004

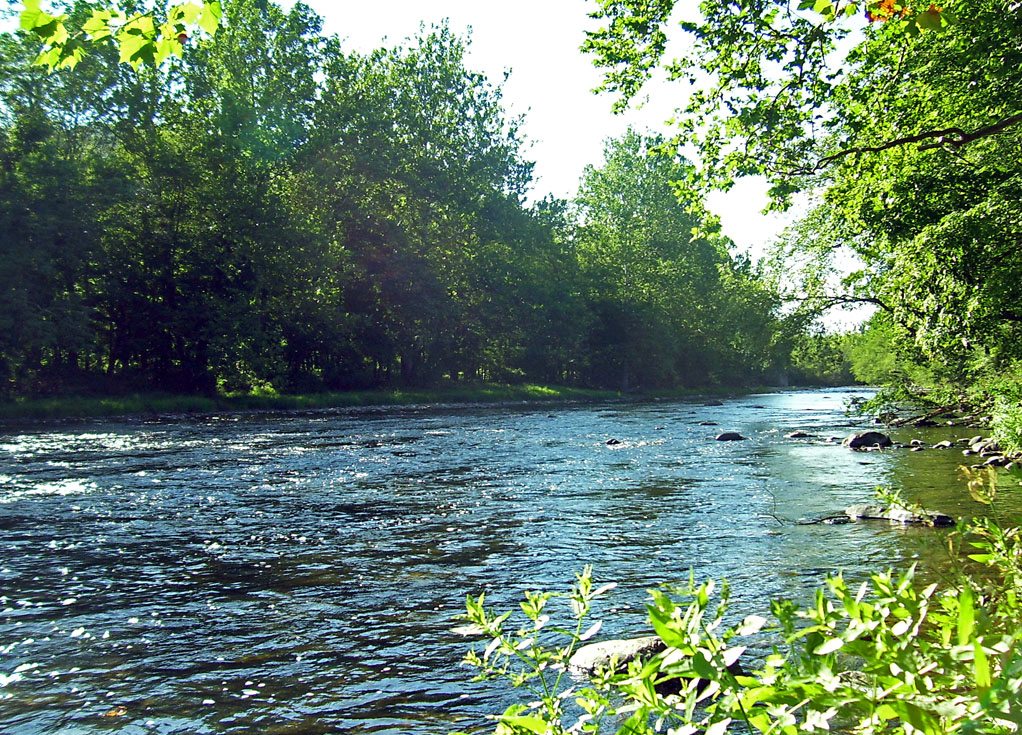
Neversink River at Cuddebackville

The Cuddebackville Dam was a concrete dam on the Neversink River in Deerpark, Orange County, New York near the town of Cuddebackville, New York, removed in October, 2004 to benefit aquatic life. It was the first dam removed in New York State for environmental reasons.

== History ==
The Cuddebackville Dam is actually two different dams that are separated by a small island. The original structure was built in the 1820s to divert water from the Neversink River into the Delaware and Hudson Canal (D&H Canal). The second structure was built in 1903. The Cuddebackville Dam was six feet high and 125 feet (38 m) across. The dam was built to divert water to turbines to generate electricity. The water was diverted into a feeder canal connected to a small hydropower plant. The plant was abandoned in 1945 because modern power lines were built to draw electricity from farther away. The dam fell into ownership of the Orange County. The dam was removed in October, 2004 by the U.S. Army Corps of Engineers in partnership with the Nature Conservancy to benefit the aquatic life in the area. Removal of the dam caused a change in the hydrology of the Neversink River and impeded the flow of water into the D&H Canal feeder. This led to the withering of the one mile long segment of the D&H Canal at Cuddebackville which had remained watered up to that time.

== Effect on aquatic life ==
The Neversink River is the home to a rich diversity of aquatic life, some of which are on the list of federally endangered species. The river is also known for its pristine water conditions. In addition to being a home to endangered species the river is an internationally famous site for fly-fishing. However, all of these qualities were being threatened by the Cuddebackville Dam. In particular, two species were under threat, the Dwarf Wedge Mussel and the American Shad.

=== Dwarf wedgemussel ===
The Neversink River contains a large population of sea mussels and the richest diversity of freshwater mussels in the upper Delaware River Basin. However, one of the seven species of mussels found in the Neversink River, the dwarf wedgemussel, is on the federal list of endangered species. This situation was not being aided by the mussels being collected by the abandoned Cuddebackville Dam. The collection of mussel species near the dam was resulting in the Neversink River's mussel population being primarily concentrated in one area, instead being well distributed throughout the river. Before the removal of the dam, not one dwarf wedgemussel could be found beyond the dam. This was making the mussels highly susceptible to extinction. A catastrophic flood, oil spill, chemical spill, or epidemic could have resulted in local extinction of the mussel populations in the Neversink River. The threat that the dam posed on the mussel life, particularly the Dwarf Wedge Mussel was one of the primary reasons for its removal.

=== American shad ===
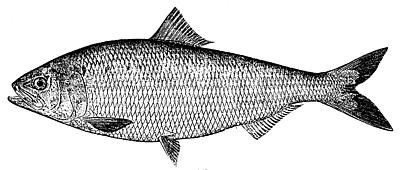
American Shad

The Cuddebackville Dam also caused problems for the fish in the Neversink River. The dam restricted the upstream movement of the American shad and the trout in the river. The New York State Department of Environmental Conservation had reported cases of schools of 100 to 1000 fish attempting to migrate up the Neversink River, only to be blocked by the dam.

== Removal ==
In order to protect the endangered aquatic life in the Neversink River the dam was removed in October, 2004. The project was a combined effort of the Nature Conservancy and the Army Corps of Engineers. Dams had previously been removed for environmental reasons in other states. However, the Cuddebackville Dam was the first dam in the state of New York to be removed solely for environmental reasons. The cost of the removal process was about $2.2 million. The Nature Conservancy covered 35% of this expense, the Army Corps of Engineers covered the rest.

=== The Nature Conservancy ===
The Nature Conservancy is known primarily for buying land that might be threatened by development due to its environmental sensitivity. The removal of the Cuddebackville Dam marked a turning point in the organization, in which they broadened their scope to protecting an endangered species by protecting an entire ecosystem. The Nature Conservancy's interest in the situation began in 1993, three years after the Dwarf Wedge Mussel was discovered and placed on the federal endangered species list. In 1993, the Nature Conservancy purchased 170 upland acres of land on the Neversink River and created the Neversink Preserve in order to protect the newly discovered species of mussel. Over time they have purchased more land so that the Neversink Preserve covers 630 acres (2.5 km^{2}). However, the Nature Conservancy found that the purchasing and protecting of the land was not enough to protect the Dwarf Wedge Mussel due to the complexity of their life cycle and the interference of the Cuddebackville Dam.

=== Army Corps of Engineers ===
The removal of the Cuddebackville Dam marked a change in purpose of the Army Corps of Engineers. The organization for over a century has been building dams and has focused on development. However, the removal of the Cuddebackville Dam marks a new trend of the Army Corps of Engineers removing dams and having an awareness of the environmental impact of the structures that they build. This also shows a changing mindset in the upcoming generation of engineers who in general may be more opposed to dam construction than their predecessors. The project also marks the first time that the Army Corps of Engineers has worked with a nonprofit organization like the Nature Conservancy since a federal law was passed in 1999 allowing such a partnership.

== See also ==
- List of dam removals in New York (state)
- IUCN Red List
- Neversink Preserve
- International Union for Conservation of Nature
- Nature conservation
- Dam removal
- Elwha Ecosystem Restoration
