= Cottage in the Pines =

- Pine Brook Manor
- U.S. National Register of Historic Places
- U.S. Historic district
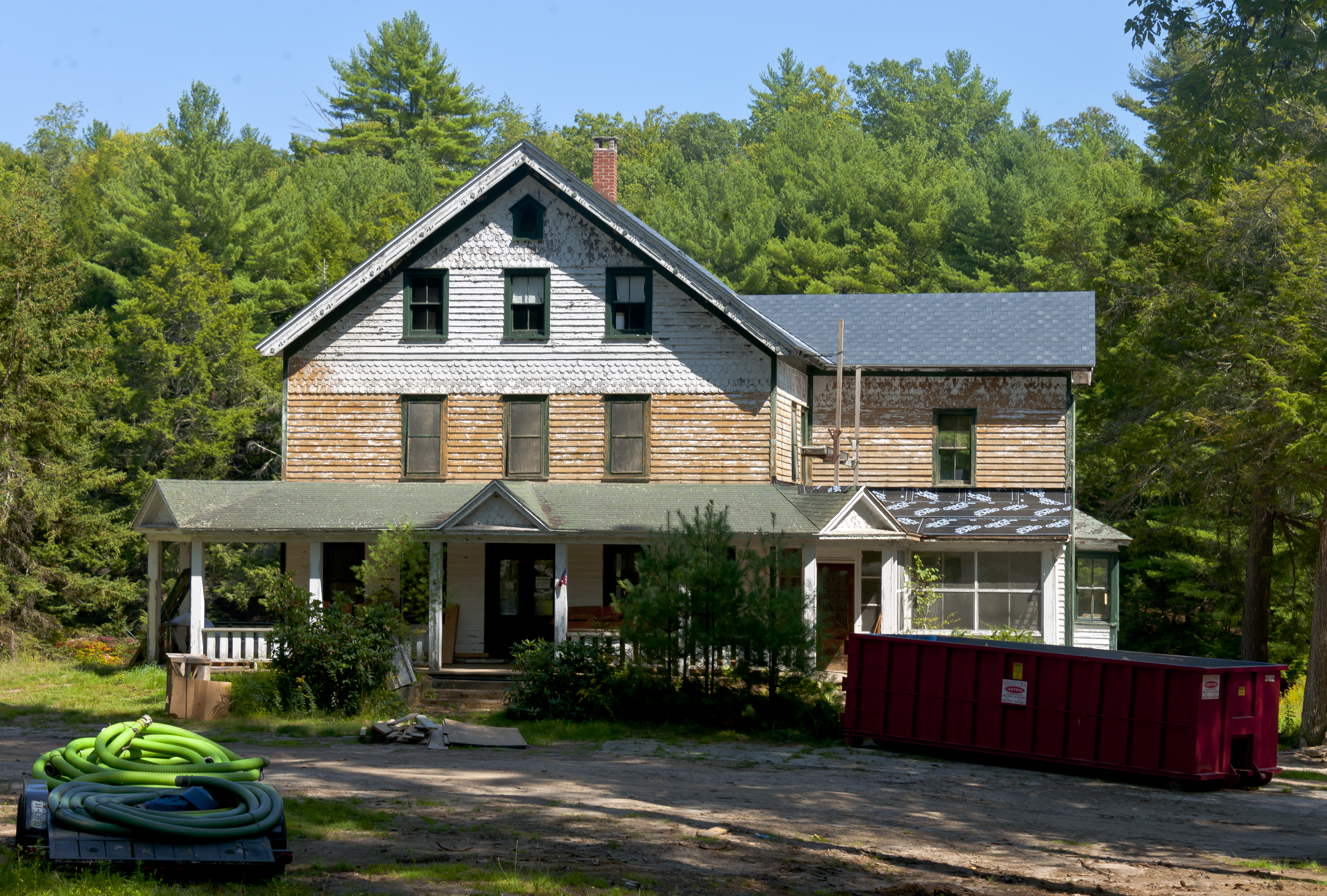
- Pine Brook Manor, September 2015

- Location within New York Location within the United States
- Location: 1200 Route 42, Rio, New York
- Coordinates: 41°29′02″N 74°44′16″W
- Area: 119.76 acres (48.47 ha)
- Built: c. 1895, 1921, c. 1936
- Built by: Peter Dunwald I & II
- Architectural style: Late Victorian
- NRHP reference No.: 15000515
- Added to NRHP: October 6, 2015

Pine Brook Manor, also known previously as Cottage in the Pines, Pine Park Cottage and Dunwald Farm, is a national historic district located at Rio in Orange County, New York. The district includes: a large three-story boarding house (c. 1895); a mill and weir (c. 1900); a large woodshop; mill pond; two smaller workshops; a machine shop (c. 1936); bungalow; and several small sheds. The boarding house is a three-story, L-shaped frame building. It features a full-width front porch and fishscale shingles. The property reflects the once popular recreational boarding house culture.

It was listed on the National Register of Historic Places in 2015.
