= Neversink Valley Grange Hall No. 1530 =

- U.S. National Register of Historic Places
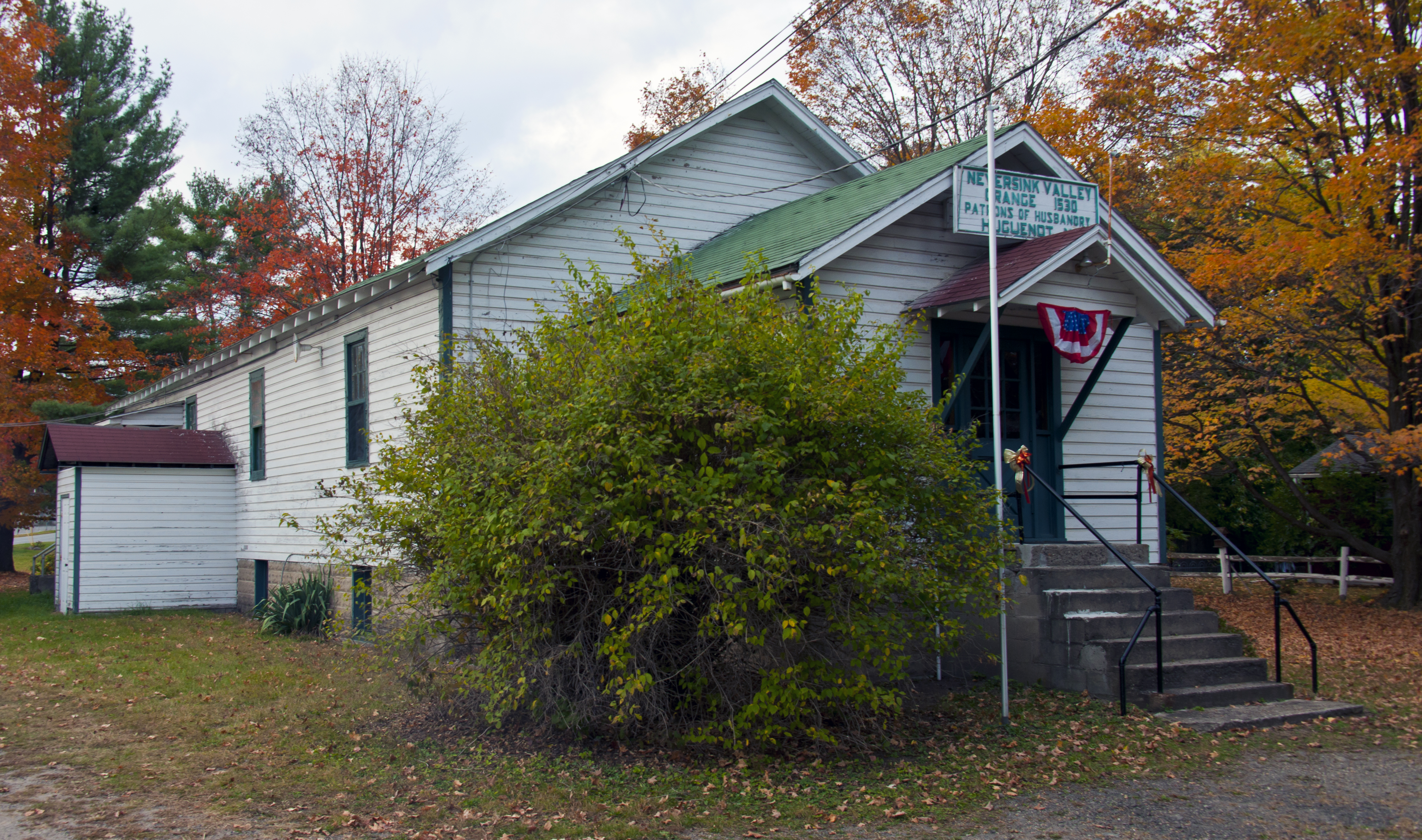

- Location within New York Location within the United States
- Location: 35 Grange Rd., Huguenot, New York
- Coordinates: 41°25′13″N 74°38′02″W
- Area: 0.53 acres (0.21 ha)
- Built: 1934, c. 1940
- NRHP reference No.: 13000910
- Added to NRHP: December 11, 2013

Neversink Valley Grange Hall No. 1530 is a historic Grange meeting hall in Huguenot, Orange County, New York, United States. Built in 1934, it is a one-story rectangular wood-frame building with a raised basement and a medium-pitched front gable roof. It features a projecting entry block that includes a vestibule and stairs to the upper and lower levels. In addition to serving as a Grange hall, the building also functioned as an early community center.

It was listed on the National Register of Historic Places in 2013.
