= New Mill Pond =

- Location within New York
- Location: Suffolk County, New York
- Coordinates: 40°50′29″N 73°13′32″W
- Type: artificial lake
- Catchment area: 23.02 sq mi (59.6 km^{2})
- Basin countries: United States
- Surface area: 109 acres (0.44 km^{2})
- Water volume: Normal 308 acre-feet (380,000 m^{3}); Max 545 acre⋅ft (672,000 m^{3})
- Surface elevation: 23 ft (7 m)

New Mill Pond is a lake in Smithtown on the Northeast Branch River in Suffolk County, New York and is used for recreational purposes. Construction was completed in 1825. It has a normal surface area of 109 acres (0.44 km^{2}). It is owned by Suffolk County Parks Department.

New Mill Pond Dam is of earthen construction. Its height is 15 feet (4.6 m) with a length of 465 feet (142 m). Its capacity is 545 acre-feet (672,000 m^{3}). Normal storage is 308 acre-feet (380,000 m^{3}). It drains an area of 23.02 square miles (59.6 km^{2}).
