= Huguenot, Orange County, New York =

Huguenot
- Hamlet
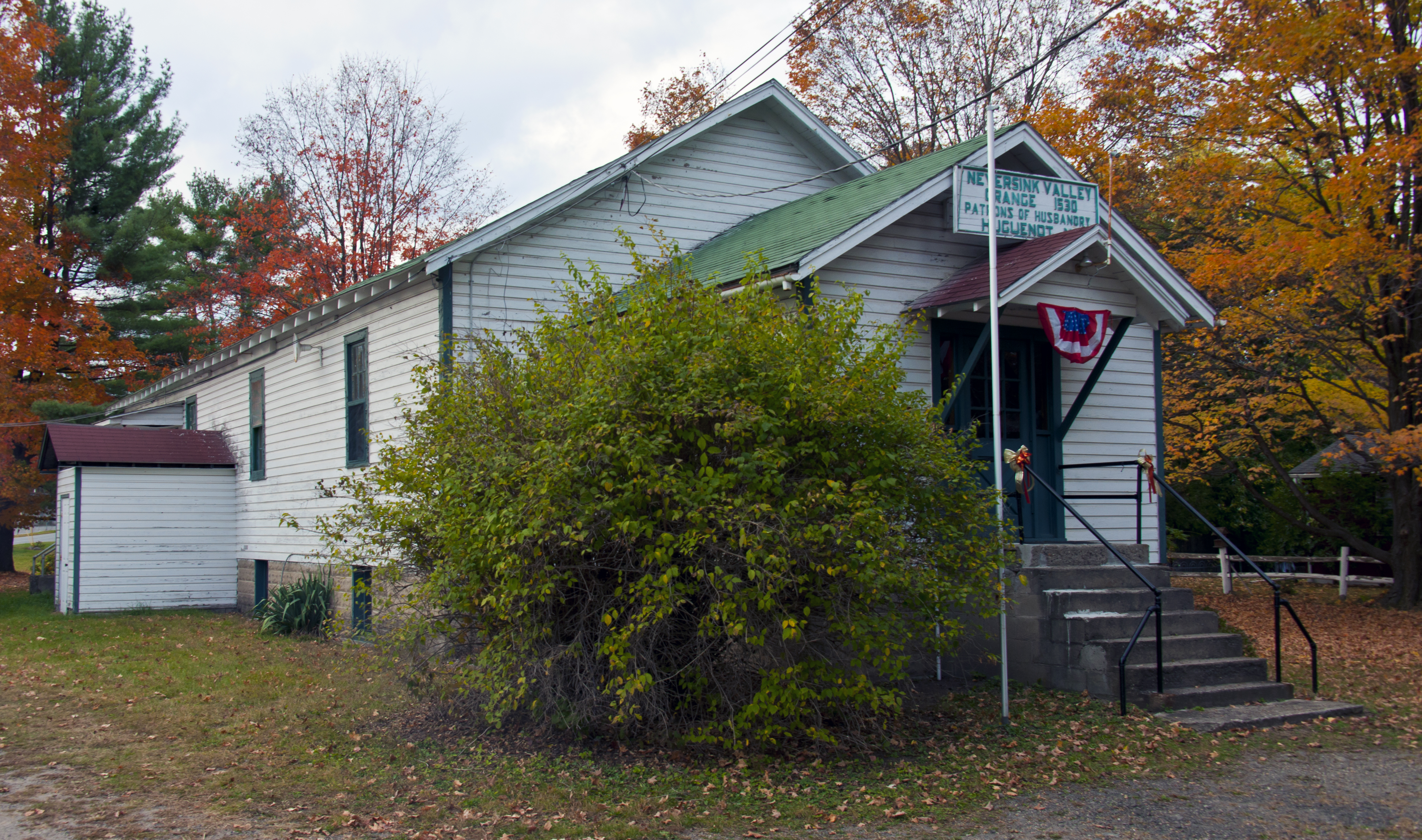
- The Neversink Valley Grange Hall No. 1530 which is located in Huguenot, New York

- Location within New York
- Coordinates: 41.418°N 74.631°W
- Country: United States
- State: New York (state)
- County: Orange
- Named for: The Huguenots
- Time zone: UTC-5 (Eastern (EST))
  - Summer (DST): UTC-4 (EDT)
- ZIP Code: 12746
- Website: https://townofdeerparkny.gov/

Huguenot is a hamlet in the town of Deerpark, in Orange County, New York, United States. It is located north of Port Jervis on US-209. Huguenot Schoolhouse and Neversink Valley Grange Hall No. 1530 are listed on the National Register of Historic Places. The community was named after Huguenot immigrants. Huguenot is also named for Huguenot families Cuddeback and Gumaer who settled the area in 1698. The Native American name for the area was Seneyaugnquan.

From 1918 to 2021 the YMCA of Greater New York maintained a YMCA camp near Huguenot. In March 2021, it was announced that the camp would be closing its doors and was to be sold. This was due to an overall loss of around $100 million during the COVID-19 pandemic.

Since 2005, an annual electro-music music festival has been held in Huguenot's Greenkill Retreat Center.
