= Deerpark, New York =

- Town
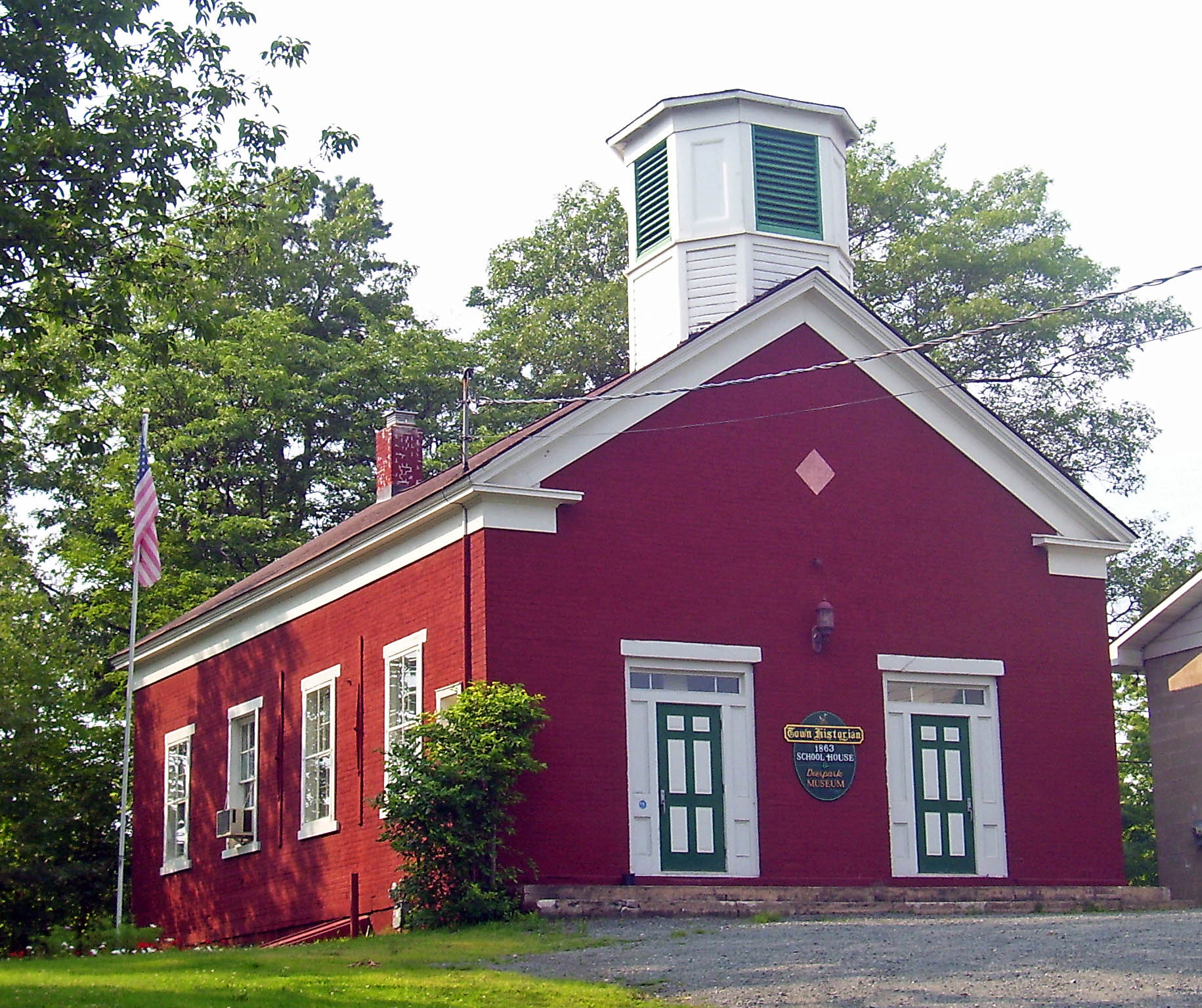
- The refurbished Huguenot Schoolhouse, now the historical museum of Deerpark

- Location in Orange County and New York

- Location within New York Location within the United States
- Coordinates: 41°27′N 74°39′W
- Country: United States
- State: New York
- County: Orange
- Settled: 1690
- Established: 1798

Government
  - Town Supervisor: Gary Spears (R, C) Town Council: Arthur T. Trovei (R, C); Christa Hoovler (R, C); Robert Whitney (R, C); Al Schock (R, C)

Area
  - Total: 67.95 sq mi (175.98 km^{2})
  - Land: 66.50 sq mi (172.23 km^{2})
  - Water: 1.45 sq mi (3.75 km^{2})

Population (2020)
  - Total: 7,509
  - Density: 112.9/sq mi (43.60/km^{2})
- Time zone: UTC-5 (EST)
  - Summer (DST): UTC-4 (EDT)
- ZIP Code: 12729, 12746, 12780, 12785
- Area code: 845
- FIPS code: 36-071-19961
- Website: townofdeerparkny.gov

Deerpark is a town in the western part of Orange County, New York, United States. It is part of the Kiryas Joel–Poughkeepsie–Newburgh metropolitan area as well as the larger New York metropolitan area. As of the 2020 Census, the population was at 7,509. As of the 2010 census, the center of population of New York state is located in Cuddebackville, a hamlet in Deerpark.

== History ==
Dutch and Huguenot colonists settled in the area in the 17th century, centered on a Dutch settlement named Waghackamack and later renamed to Minisink. The settlement was part of the boundary dispute between New York and New Jersey, which began circa 1700 and was not resolved until 1773. During the American Revolution, the area was raided twice by Mohawk Leader, Joseph Brant. The more impactful of the raids took place on July 20, 1779, causing mass destruction in the town and leading to the Battle of Minisink.

The town of Deerpark would be established in 1798, being formed from the southeastern section of Mamakating. The town got its name from a tract of land enclosed with a brush fence, referred to as "McDaniel’s Deerpark” by locals. On May 11, 1853, what is now Port Jervis would split off from the town, becoming its own incorporated village.

== Geography ==
According to the United States Census Bureau, the town has a total area of 67.9 square miles (176 km^{2}), of which 66.4 square miles (172 km^{2}) is land and 1.5 square miles (3.9 km^{2}) (2.14%) is water. It is considered the second largest town in area in Orange County.

The southwestern town line is the border of Pennsylvania, marked by the Delaware River. The western and northern town lines are the border of Sullivan County, New York. The Neversink River flows through the town. The city of Port Jervis is located at the southern corner of the town, and a small portion of the town borders on Montague Township, New Jersey.

US Route 209 parallels the course of the Neversink River. Hawk's Nest scenic overlook along New York State Route 97 offers views of the Delaware River. Interstate 84 passes through the southern portion of town near the New Jersey state line.

== Demographics ==
Historical population
Census	Pop.	Note	%±
1800	955		—
1810	1,230		28.8%
1820	1,340		8.9%
1830	1,167		−12.9%
1840	1,607		37.7%
1850	4,032		150.9%
1860	5,186		28.6%
1870	9,387		81.0%
1880	11,420		21.7%
1890	2,156		−81.1%
1900	1,932		−10.4%
1910	1,696		−12.2%
1920	1,615		−4.8%
1930	1,779		10.2%
1940	2,227		25.2%
1950	2,519		13.1%
1960	2,777		10.2%
1970	4,370		57.4%
1980	5,633		28.9%
1990	7,832		39.0%
2000	7,858		0.3%
2010	7,901		0.5%
2020	7,509		−5.0%
U.S. Decennial Census

As of the census of 2000, there were 7,858 people, 2,906 households, and 2,115 families residing in the town. The population density was 118.3 inhabitants per square mile (45.7/km^{2}). There were 3,332 housing units at an average density of 50.2 per square mile (19.4/km^{2}). The racial makeup of the town was 90.52% white, 5.54% African American, .27% Native American, .57% Asian, .74% from other races, and 1.36% from two or more races. Hispanic or Latino of any race were 5.82% of the population.

There were 2,906 households, out of which 35.7% had children under the age of 18 living with them, 58.4% were married couples living together, 9% had a female householder with no husband present, and 27.2% were non-families. 20.9% of all households were made up of individuals, and 7.9% had someone living alone who was 65 years of age or older. The average household size was 2.7 and the average family size was 3.12.

In the town, the population was spread out, with 27.5% under the age of 18, 6.3% from 18 to 24, 29.4% from 25 to 44, 25.8% from 45 to 64, and 11.0% who were 65 years of age or older. The median age was 38 years. For every 100 females, there were 100.1 males. For every 100 females age 18 and over, there were 97.5 males age 18 and over.

The median income for a household in the town was $45,000, and the median income for a family was $49,987. Males had a median income of $40,070 versus $25,642 for females. The per capita income for the town was $18,252. About 7.4% of families and 14.8% of the population were below the poverty line, including 10.9% of those under age 18 and 5.5% of those age 65 or over.

== Communities and locations ==
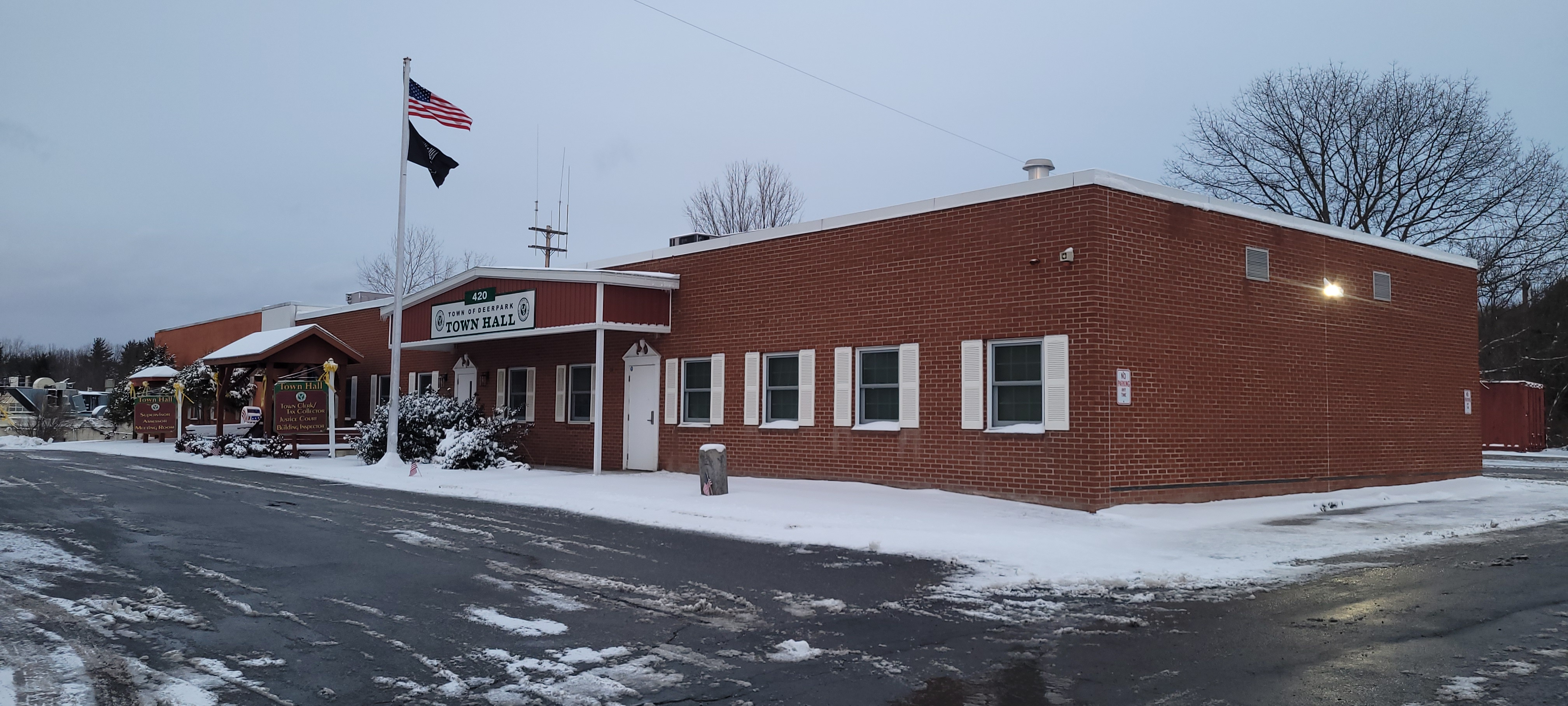
Deerpark Town Hall

- Cahoonzie – A hamlet in the western part of the town on NY-42.
- Cuddebackville – A hamlet at the intersection of US-209 and NY-211, located approximately ten miles north of Port Jervis. The community was named after Colonel William Cuddeback, the original owner of the site.
- Dragon Springs – A compound of the Falun Gong movement, home to its leader Li Hongzhi and many of his followers.
- Godeffroy – A small hamlet south of Cuddebackville on US-209.
- Huguenot – A hamlet north of Port Jervis on US-209. Huguenot Schoolhouse and Neversink Valley Grange Hall No. 1530 are listed on the National Register of Historic Places. The community is named after the Huguenot immigrants that moved there to escape religious persecution.
- Montague Valley Wildlife Management Area – A conservation area near Cahoonzie.
- Paradise – A hamlet on County Road 7 by the northern town line.
- Port Orange – A hamlet north of Cuddebackville on US-209.
- Prospect Hill – A hamlet west of Cuddebackville.
- Rio – A hamlet on NY-42 near the northern town line. Cottage in the Pines was listed on the National Register of Historic Places in 2015.
- Roses Point – A location south of Cuddebackville on US-209.
- Sparrowbush – A hamlet and census-designated place west of Port Jervis on NY-42 and the Delaware River.
- Westbrookville – A hamlet north of Cuddebackville on US-209, located on the border of Orange and Sullivan County

== Education ==
Port Jervis School District serves most of Deerpark, with a small portion zoned to Eldred Central School District.

The Port Jervis district operates Hamilton Bicentennial Elementary School (HBE) in Cuddebackville. Additionally, East Main Elementary School (EME) is located in Port Jervis, serving all city residents as well as some town residents located closer to Port Jervis. The zoned secondary schools for the district are Port Jervis Middle School and Port Jervis High School, both of which are operated in the same building, which is physically located in Deerpark, but uses a Port Jervis street address.

== Notable people ==
- Karl A. Brabenec, former town supervisor and member of the New York State Assembly, from the 98th District (2014–present)
- H. Frank Bigger, Orange County Sheriff (1995-2002) and former New York State Trooper.
- James F. Garvey, Orange County Sheriff (1990-1995) and former town supervisor (1976-1979, 1984-1990).
- Jean Amatucci Fox, former member of the New York State Assembly, from the 98th District (1975–1978)
- Mark D. Fox, former United States Magistrate Judge in the U.S. District Court for the Southern District of New York (1988-2008).
- Bruce Manning, filmmaker, screenwriter, and novelist
- William H. Cuddeback, politician and judge who was on the New York Court of Appeals (1912–1919)
- Thomas Samuel Swartwout, early settler and founder of the town (Wagheckemeck Patent, October 14, 1697) along with Pierre Guimard, Jacques Caudebec, Anthony Swartwout, Bernardus Swartwout, David Jamison & Jan Tyse.

== See also ==
- Chinese people in New York City
- Cuddebackville Dam
- Neversink Preserve
- Huguenot Schoolhouse
