= Huguenot Schoolhouse =

- U.S. National Register of Historic Places
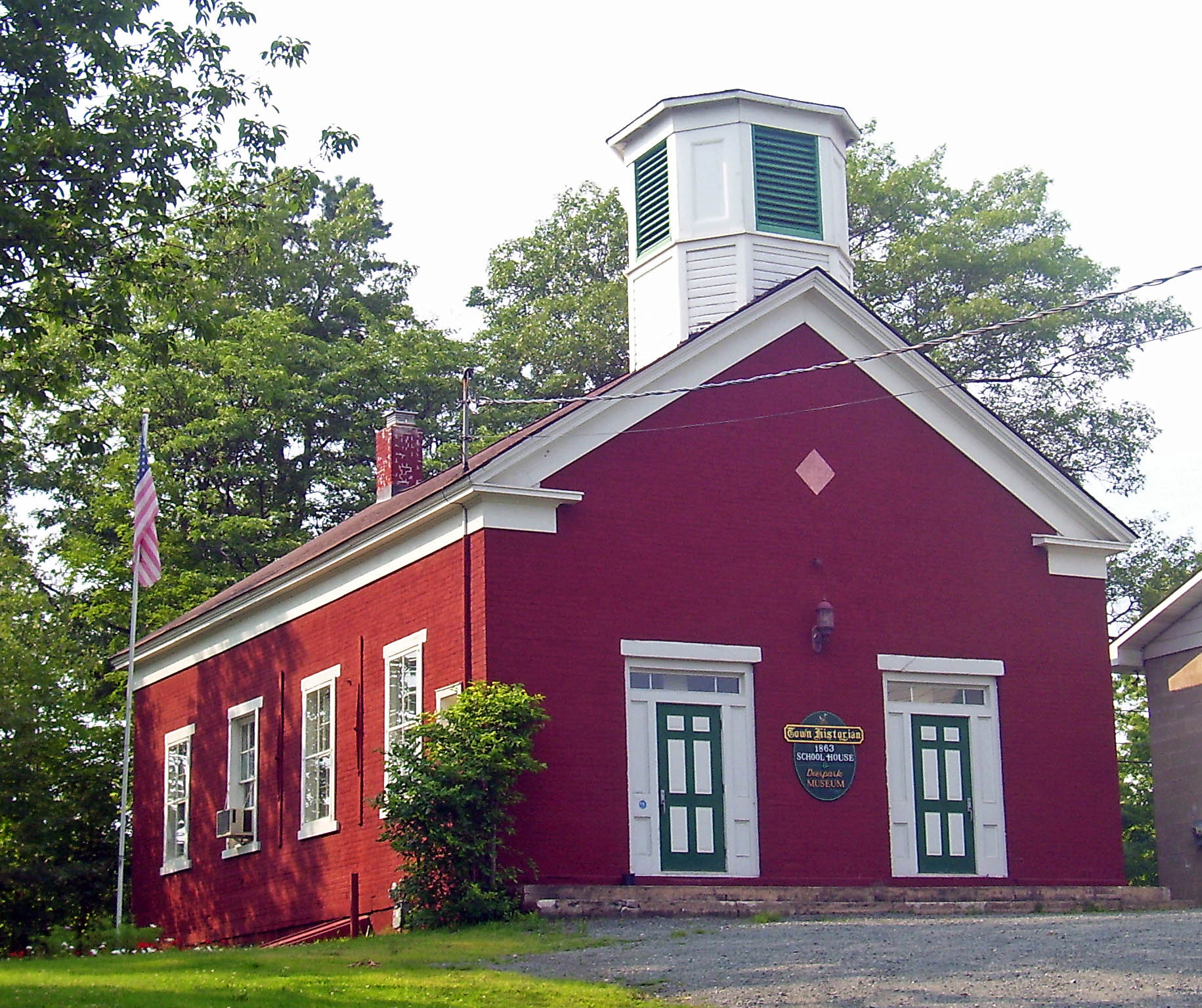
- The refurbished schoolhouse in 2007

- Location within New York Location within the United States
- Interactive map showing the location of Huguenot Schoolhouse
- Location: Old Grange Rd., south of the junction of Old Grange and Big Pond Rds., Deerpark, NY; U.S.
- Nearest city: Port Jervis
- Coordinates: 41°25′11″N 74°37′58″W
- Area: less than one acre
- Built: 1863
- Architectural style: Mid 19th Century Revival, Greek Revival
- NRHP reference No.: 97000938
- Added to NRHP: August 21, 1997

The Huguenot Schoolhouse, also known as District Schoolhouse No. 3, the 1863 Schoolhouse and the Town of Deerpark Museum, is located on South Grange Road a short distance from US 209 in Huguenot, a hamlet of the Town of Deerpark in Orange County, New York, United States. It was built in 1863, and is a large, one-story, Greek Revival style masonry building. It closed as a school in 1961, and currently serves as a local historic museum.

It was added to the National Register of Historic Places in 1997, the only property in the town of Deerpark so recognized besides the remnants of the Delaware and Hudson Canal.

== See also ==
- National Register of Historic Places listings in Orange County, New York
