= New York – New Jersey Line War =

18th-century skirmishes on the New York–New Jersey border

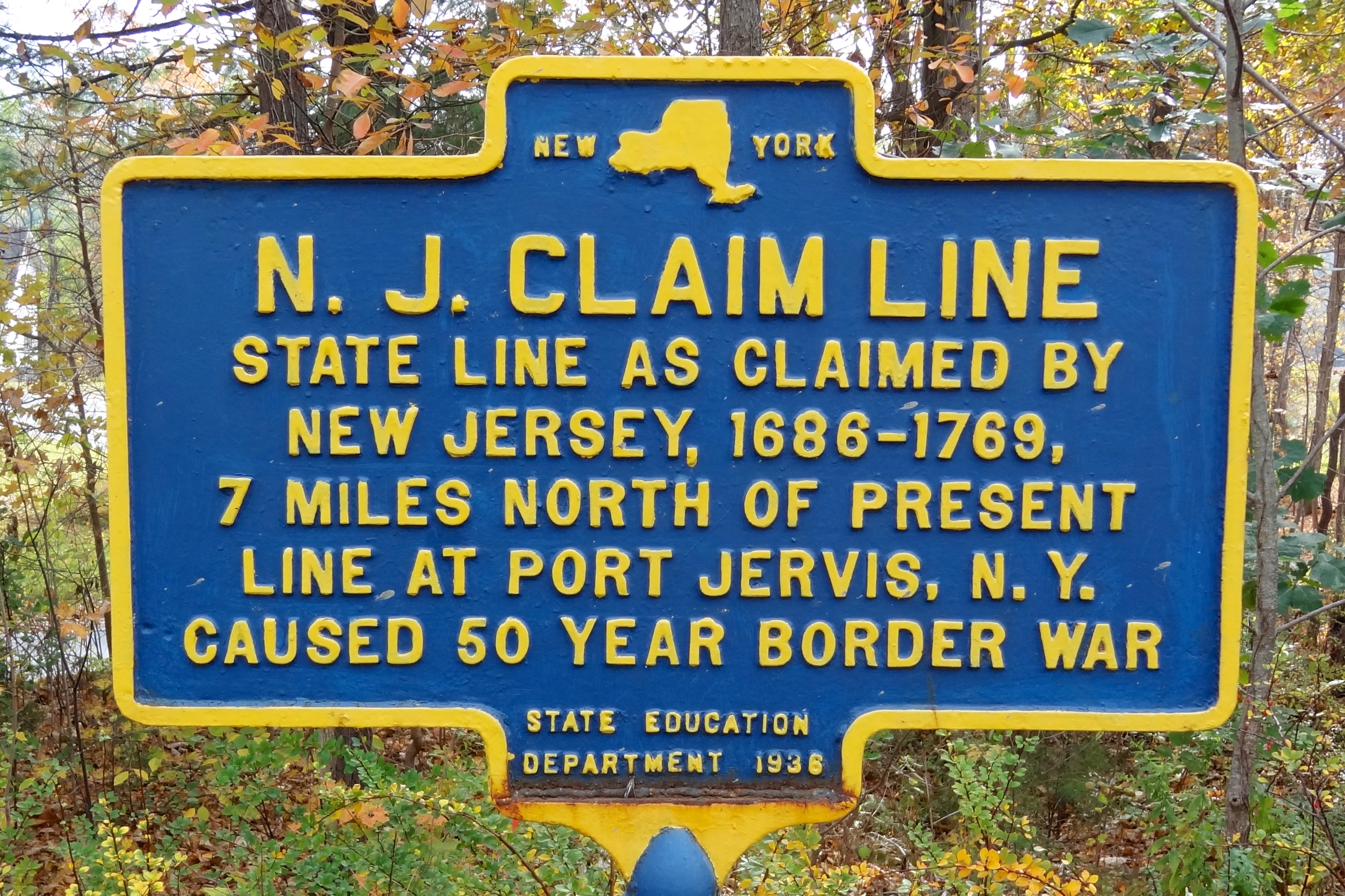
Border War historic marker, Deerpark, New York

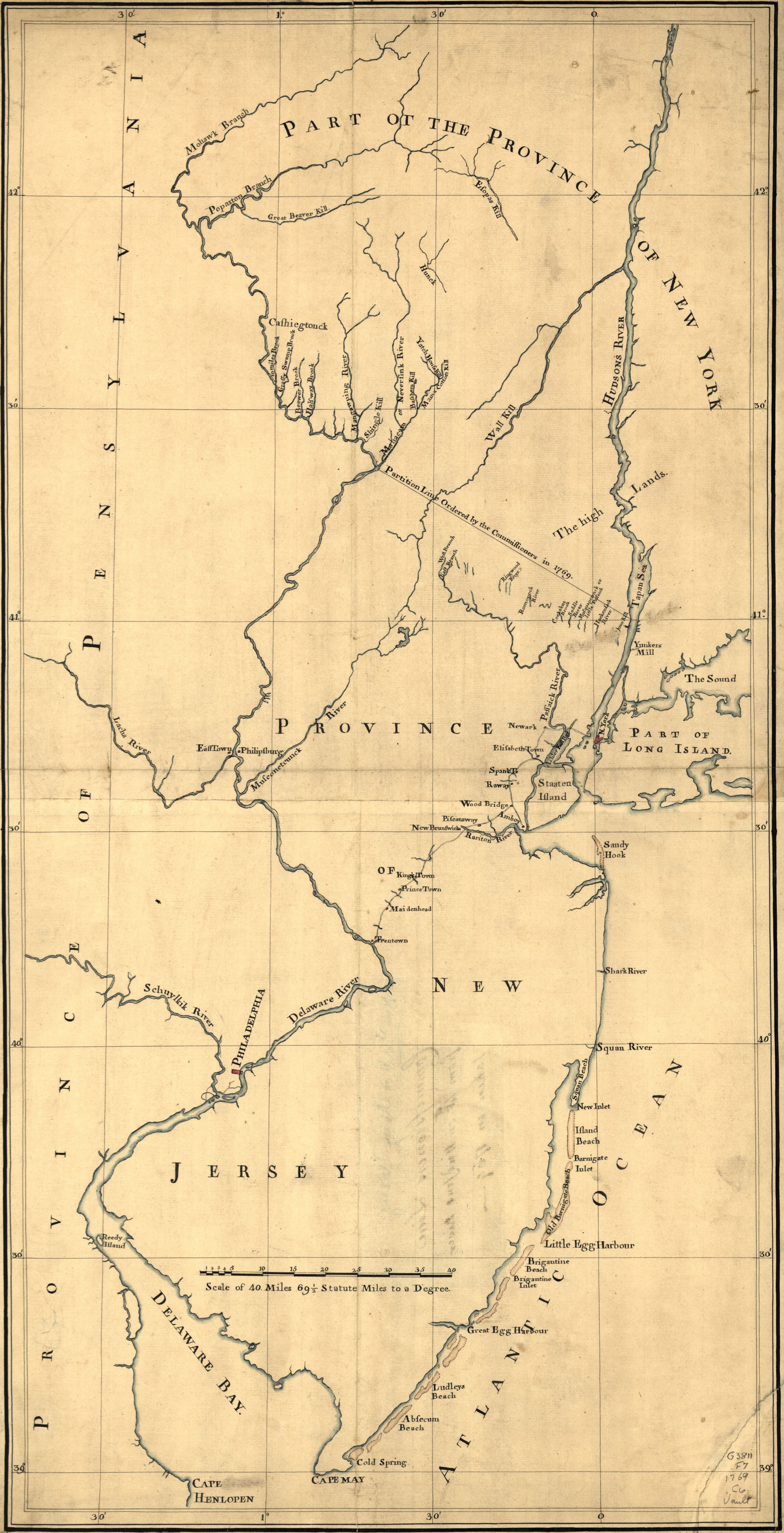
Partition line ordered by the commissioners in 1769

The New York – New Jersey Line War (also known as the N.J. Line War) was a series of skirmishes and raids that took place for over half a century between 1701 and 1765 at the disputed border between two American colonies, the Province of New York and the Province of New Jersey.

Border wars were not unusual in the early days of settlements of the colonies and originated in conflicting land claims. Because of ignorance, willful disregard, and legal ambiguities, such conflicts arose involving local settlers until a final settlement was reached. In the largest of these squabbles some 210,000 acres (850 km^{2}) of land were at stake between New York and New Jersey.

In this situation originally the western and northern border of New Jersey ran "along said River or Bay (the Delaware) to the northward as far as the northward most branch of the said Bay or River, which is in latitude 41 degrees, 40 minutes and crosseth over thence in a straight line to the latitude 41 degrees on Hudson's River." Said point on the Delaware is Cochecton or Station Point. This border, set by the Royal Commission of 1664, had been acknowledged by both the New York and New Jersey legislatures by 1719.

However, the northbound extension of New Jersey was not respected by settlers from New York who moved westward from Orange County. The resulting conflict was carried out by settlers from both sides. In addition, these settlers had to fight off Native Americans who also raided the area during the French and Indian War.

The last fight broke out in 1765, when the Jerseyans attempted to capture the leaders of the New York faction. Because the fight took place on the Sabbath, neither side used weapons. The New York leaders were captured and kept briefly in the Sussex County jail.

The conflict was eventually settled. The King of Great Britain through the royal commission of October 7, 1769, appointed commissioners to establish what would become the permanent and final border that runs southeast from the Tri-States Monument at the confluence of the Delaware and Neversink Rivers near Port Jervis to the Hudson River. The New York and New Jersey legislatures ratified the compromise in 1772, and the King approved it on September 1, 1773.

== Early settlement ==
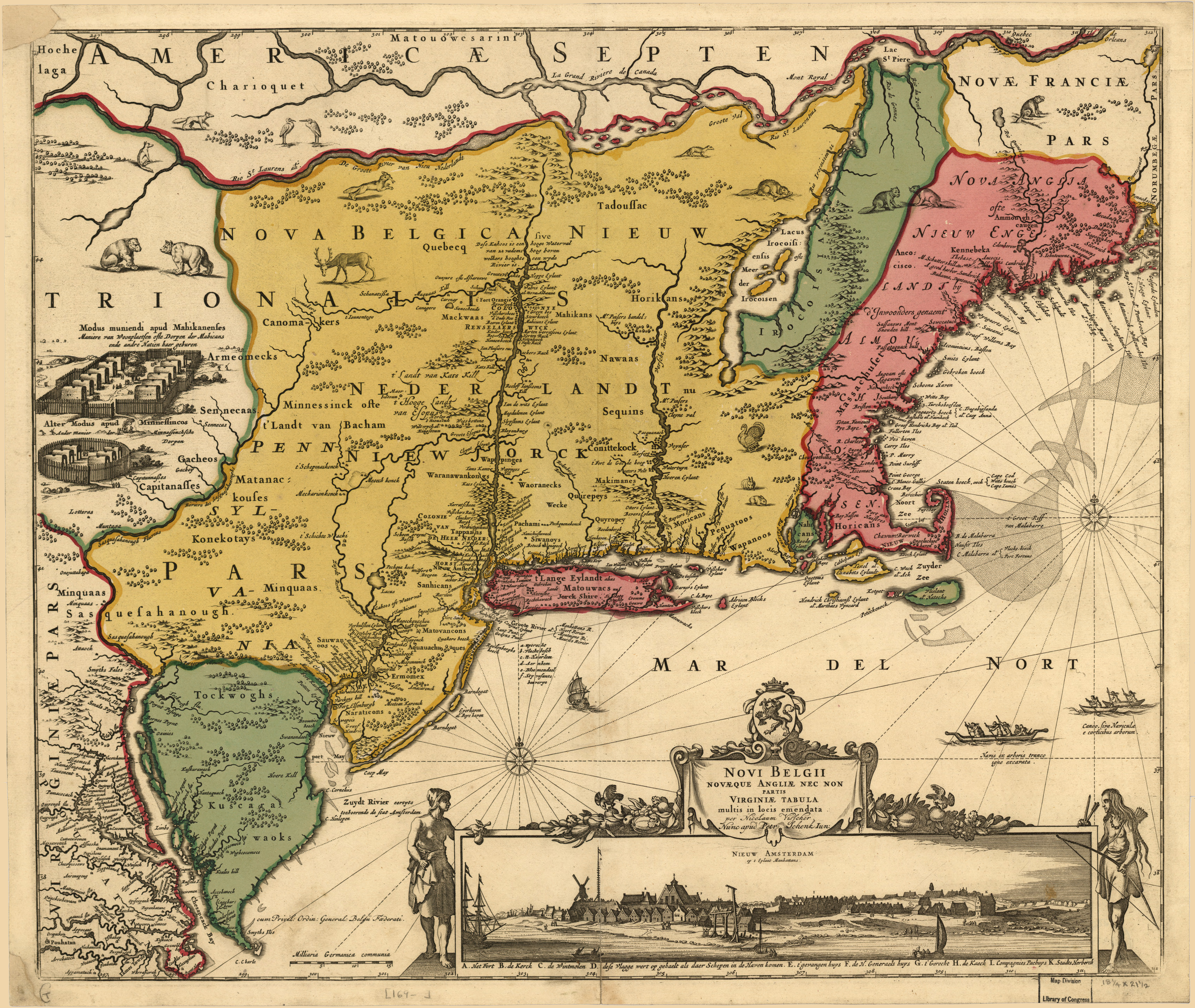
The Jansson–Visscher map of the American Northeast first published by Adriaen van der Donck

Early in 1665 the Governor of the Royal Colony of New York, Colonel Richard Nicolls, received news that James, the Duke of York, had granted a charter for New Jersey to two court friends, Sir George Carteret and John Lord Berkeley. Governor Nicolls immediately realized that the charter meant the loss of valuable land from the New York colony, and was compelled to write the Duke to tell him that the land comprising New Jersey, as delineated in the charter,

comprehended all the improveable part of Your Royal Highness his Pattent and capable to receive twenty times more people than Long Island and all the remaining Tracts in Your Royal Highness his patent in respect not onely to the quantity of the Land but to the Coast of Delaware River the fertility of the soyle the neighborhood to Hudsons River, and lastly the faire hopes of Rich mines, to the utter discouragement of any that shall desire to live under your Royal Highness his protection.

Governor Nicolls believed that the magnitude of the loss was so great that it could have only resulted from a conspiracy against the fortune of the Duke, and he continued his letter by stating,

Neither can I suppose that My Lord Berkeley or Sir G. Carterett know how prejudiciall such a graunt would prove to Your Royal Highness, but I must charge it upon Capt. Scott who was borne to make mischiefe as farre as hee is credited or his parts serve him. This Scot (it seems) aim's at the same patent which Your Royal Highness hath, and hath since given words out that hee had injury done him by Your Royal Highness, whereupon he contriv'd and betrayed my Lord Berkeley and Sir. G. Carterett into a designe (contrary to their knowledge) of ruining all the hopes of increases in this Your Royal Highness his territory, which hee hath fully compleated, unless Your Royal Highness take farther order herein.

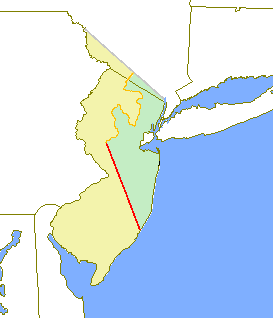
Map showing the original provinces of West Jersey (yellow) and East Jersey (green) with the straight Keith Line (red), and the irregular Coxe and Barclay Line (orange)

Thus from the establishment of the colony of New Jersey the leaders of New York realized that they had lost a very valuable territory with great potential. This realization compelled Governor Nicolls and many of his successors to wish and scheme for the reannexation of New Jersey to New York, or at least obtain compensation for its loss. In New York's favor in these efforts was the very charter for New Jersey granted by the Duke. It was based on an inaccurate map created by the Dutch cartographer Nicolas Johannis Visscher in 1654. The Jansson–Visscher map, as it would later become known, established the northernmost branch of the Delaware River at latitude 41°40′ North. Based on this information, the Duke designated the following points as the northern stations for the boundary line between New York and New Jersey:

and to the Northward as far as the Northernmost branch of the said Bay or River of Delaware, which is forty one Degrees and forty minutes of Latitude and crosseth over thence in a straight line to Hudson's River in forty one Degrees of Latitude

If the northernmost branch of the Delaware had been found at 41°40′ little doubt would have existed as to the exact location of New Jersey's northern boundary line. But no branch existed at this latitude. The confusion created by this revelation would be capitalized on by New York in order to stall any attempts at establishing the border's exact location and, thus, the legitimacy and stability so necessary for a healthy business environment in the new colony of New Jersey. It would be New York's contention that, since the branch did not exist at this location, the actual border should be much farther south. It was New York's hope that New Jersey, being a much smaller, poorer and less politically connected colony, would eventually have to compromise and move the border south in order to end this draining border dispute. The problems created by this mistake in cartography would begin in 1676, with negotiations between the provinces of East and West Jersey over the location of their mutual partition line, and would not end until 1769, when a Royal commission to solve the New York/New Jersey northern boundary dispute would impose a compromise border line. The dispute, including its complicated political and economic battles and small skirmishes between residents of both states, is generally considered to have ended with the compromise of 1769. However, in 1896, a joint state commission completed an accurate survey that compensated for measurement distortions caused by local iron ore formations.

== Berkeley and Carteret experience financial problems ==
During 1674, following a short period in which the Dutch had once again established control over most of the region, Berkeley and Carteret found themselves in serious financial difficulties. Due to these difficulties Lord Berkeley sold his share in New Jersey to Edward Byllynge, who immediately sold parts of the share to a group of Quakers who were hoping to create their own colony in New Jersey. But before this new settlement could be begun, it was necessary to establish clearly the border between lands owned by Carteret and the Quakers. An agreement was arrived at with Carteret, on July 1, 1676, which would become known as the "Quintipartite Deed." This agreement divided the colony of New Jersey into East and West sections, with the partition line stretching "from the eastside of Little Egg Harbor, straight north, through the country, to the utmost branch of Delaware River." Obviously the exact location of this line would be dependent upon the exact border with New York, which was also located on this branch. But where exactly was this elusive branch of the Delaware River? The East New Jersey Board of Proprietors would lead the effort to establish the location of the northern station point because of the importance of this question in establishing title over much of their territory. Without a firm border, how could grants be made with firm titles; more importantly, without firm titles, how could new business and communities be established?

== Early survey attempts ==
The first attempt to establish the location of the northern border of New Jersey was made in 1684. Evidence of this attempt is only circumstantial in nature, and is found in documents only as background information for other subjects. Pasting together a rough picture, it seems as though Governors Thomas Dongan of New York and Gawen Lawrie of New Jersey, along with their respective councils, met near Tappan on the Hudson River. They agreed to establish the east station point of the border at the mouth of Tappan Creek, and assured each other that surveyors would soon be hired to run the final line to the Delaware River. A discussion of this Tappan meeting is found in the minutes of the Council of New York for April 9, 1684, which instructed the Indians to observe the surveyors while they placed markers on the Delaware, and to sell only to New Yorkers land to the north of that line. Other evidence that this meeting occurred is written in a deed granted by the Governor and Council of New Jersey in 1685, which referred to a location "at Tappan Creek upon the Hudson's River at the line of Division agreed upon by the Governors of the two provinces."

Seventy years later, Governor Robert Morris, in an affidavit used to support New Jersey's border claim, described what he had heard of this meeting.

I Do hereby Certify that some Time in or about as I Believe the year 1685, or 1686, Col. Thomas Dongan then Governor of New York and others met with Gawen Lawry, then Governor of New Jersey with some of the Gentlemen of the Council of New Jersey and others at a Place nigh which stood afterwards the house of Col. William Merrett on the West Side of Husdsons River where an observation was then made of the latitude and mark'd with a Pen Knife on a Beech-Tree standing by a small Run or Spring of Water that Run down the North Side of the Place where I think Merrett's House afterwards stood. Sometime Early in the Beginning of the year 1691. I went and Remark'd the said Tree but do not Remember what was the Latitude that was mark'd thereon. They went afterwards to a House to the Southward of a Place Call'd Verdrietige Hook and from thence Southerly to a Farmer's to the Northward of Tapan Meadow at the Bottom of the Bay, I cannot particularly Remember whether observations was made at one or both these Places – but I was told They there did Agree that the Mouth of Tapan Creek should be the Point of Partition on Hudsons River.

Little was done after the 1684 meeting, and there is no solid evidence that a survey was ever completed. In 1754, to complicate and thus stall proceedings attempting to settle the border dispute, New York would claim that evidence had been found indicating that a survey was made in 1684, and that the surveyors had placed the northern station point at the southern end of Minisink Island (an island today near Milford, Pennsylvania), and marked with a pen knife on a tree. But this 'evidence' was never produced by New York for inspection.

== First survey attempt ==
It was not until 1686 that an agreement was reached between the Governors of New York and New Jersey to survey a line. This agreement is reported in the minutes of the Council of New York and the East New Jersey Proprietors in June and July 1686, respectively. George Keith, of East New Jersey, Andrew Robinson, of West New Jersey, and Philip Wells of New York, met along the Delaware on September 1, 1686, to survey to line. The Council of New York instructed Wells:

You are carefully and with great exactness to run the Line between this province and that of East Jersey, beginning in the latitude of forty-one degrees and forty minutes upon the Delaware River.

Wells and Robinson established the location of 41°40′ along the Delaware, and then proceeded to the Hudson River and established the position of 41° at that location (figure 2). No evidence exists concerning the exact location identified by the surveyors as the west station, but most historians believe it was near the actual modern location of 41° 40.' Additionally, a great deal of controversy exists over the east station's exact placing. The East New Jersey Proprietors later claimed—a means to counter New York claims for a more southerly border—that this station was 4 miles (6.4 km) and 45 chains north of Tappan Creek, the border station previously established by the governors. But most references to the survey of the time seem to indicate that the survey simply re-established the mouth of Tappan Creek as the station point. Once again an actual line was never drawn. A possible reason can be found in a letter from Daniel Coxe to the Proprietors of West New Jersey, dated September 5, 1687, which suggests that the final survey was held up while waiting for West New Jersey to agree with the results of this survey. Cox wrote:

It was a great defect on your part, to agree upon a division either with New-York or East-Jersy, until you had a most exact survey of the country; they of New York and East Jersey, have in this respect, exercised the highest prudence, knowing the whole country to a little, and thereby have both overreached you. I have seen their draught, than which nothing can be more exact; but they dare not yet print them, till they have adjusted the affair with you, lest their own maps should rise up witness against them.

There is no evidence that there was ever agreement, since no border line was established clearly at that time. But this confusion did not totally inhibit the settlement of surrounding areas, and perhaps was actually encouraged by the competing colonial governments attempting to establish de facto control over the area.

== Development along the disputed border ==
By the mid-1680s slow development began on the eastern edge of the border region, along the Hudson River. It is documented that the East New Jersey Proprietors, on February 19–20, 1685, leased property along Tappan Creek to a family named Lockhart. New Jersey would later claim that during 1686, Governor Dongan of New York actually gave New York grants to lands on the New Jersey side of Tappan Creek, and then forced those in the area with East New Jersey proprietary grants to pay an additional price for a New York grant for the same land or be forced to leave. It was even claimed that Governor Dongan had all New York grants predate New Jersey's by one day, so they could be used as evidence in any later property and border disputes. These governmental actions along the border region created a great deal of insecurity among settlers and holders of land grants, and may have resulted in uncommon settlement patterns near Tappan Creek.

The first settlement along the western border region began in 1690 with the founding of the town of Port Jervis on the Delaware River by the Cortright, Van Auken, Westbrook, Decker, Kuykendal, Westfall, Titsworth, Cole, and Davis families.

As previously reported, the government was taking little action to firmly establish the border line. However, increasing settlement allowed the confusion and problems with the border dispute to grow and become more complicated.

In a letter from Governor Hamilton of New Jersey to Governor Fletcher of New York, dated February 13, 1693, the east station point of the border was again established at Tappan Creek (as was done in 1684), due west of Frederick Philipse's Lower Mill. Governor Hamilton asked that a joint effort between the colonies be undertaken to exactly survey the line, so that taxes could be assessed correctly, and militia training begun. The Council of New York responded to Hamilton's proposal by setting up a committee to discuss it, but there are no reports of any decisions being made by this committee. The East New Jersey Board of Proprietors, frustrated by inaction after repeated complaints to New York, voted on May 5, 1695, to complete the necessary border survey on their own. John Reid, the East New Jersey Surveyor General, was instructed to carry out this survey, but due to his reported preoccupation with other matters, this action was not to be carried out until 1719.

The 1690s saw settlement continue to pick up along the border, much of it as the result of a land granting scheme on the part of New York, which hoped that the creation of a de facto border would eventually become the final boundary line with New Jersey.

One of the first beneficiaries of this scheme was Captain Arent Schuyler, who was originally sent by New York to explore the Minisink region in 1694. He was so impressed with the area that he returned in May 1697 to settle a 1,000-acre (4.0 km^{2}) patent of his own, which was granted to him by Governor Fletcher of New York. Fletcher, in 1696, also granted a 1,200-acre (4.9 km^{2}) patent to Jacob Cedebec, Thomas Swartwout, Gerritt Aeritsen and others in the Minisink region, and the Kakiate patent on the eastern end of the border to Honan and Hawden. But New York was not alone in granting land within the disputed region in hopes of creating a de facto border; the East New Jersey Proprietors granted John Johnston and George Wollocks land in the border region and appointed them proprietors. But New York's efforts in granting land were more effective. By 1701 the Minisink Country area had enough residents to be given permission to hold an election as part of Ulster County, New York.

== Friction along the border ==
Settlement along the border was creating inevitable friction between settlers representing each colony. The first report of problems appears indirectly in a November 1, 1700, Act passed by the Council of New York. The act deals with a dispute between two residents of Kingston, New York, Gerritt Aeritsen and Thomas Swartwout. Aeritsen had contacted the Council complaining that Swartwout was not holding to his part of their 1696 joint grant of land in the Minisink Country. The Council passed an act instructing Swartwout to honor the agreement, and within the act they also requested that Governor Bellomont of New York begin considering the increasing friction between New York and New Jersey residents along the disputed border. Aeritsen, when he approached the council, must also have told them of the increasing threat to property because of the continuing dispute over the border.

In response, Governor Bellomont contacted the Board of Trade in London asking for assistance. The Board wrote back to Bellomont on April 29, 1701, indicating that it would "be pleased to give some order," and requested a report be sent about the situation. However, before the letter reached him, the Governor had died. His successor decided to ignore the offer of help from the Board of Trade. Settling the dispute would only result in decreasing his power, and restricting him from making grants of land within the disputed area, and thus didn't make any attempt to establish de facto control.

The amount of confusion and lack of control exhibited by the proprietors of New Jersey—especially when dealing with land title disputes among their grantees, a direct result of working with unsecured boundaries—gave Queen Anne justification to remove the responsibility for New Jersey from the proprietors, although they would still be permitted to allocate and grant all unsold lands. Queen Anne united East and West New Jersey with New York on April 15, 1702. Unification would continue until 1738, when New Jersey finally broke free again. The confusion and insecurity created by the border dispute had played into the hands of New York and increased its ability to control events. Obviously, there was no reason for the Governors of New York to hurry and resolve this border controversy.

In May 1703, Lord Cornbury (who in July would be appointed Governor of New York and New Jersey) addressed the New York General Assembly. He said that New York's loss of territory (New Jersey) was irremediable, but that compensation could and should be obtained for this loss. Cornbury, who was obviously not on New Jersey's side concerning this matter, encouraged the Assembly to continue New York's liberal land granting policies so as to force New Jersey into granting compensation to New York in order to settle the border dispute. Immediately upon becoming Governor of New York and New Jersey, Cornbury began to grant floating patents for land, with sizes dependent on the actual location of New York's southern border with New Jersey. These floating grants made an already volatile situation worse, as settlers attempted to restrict settlement either to the south or the north of their patents so as to enlarge the size of their floating patents.

== The Wawayanda and Minisink patents ==
The Wawayanda Patent was the first of these floating patents. It was granted in 1703 to John Bridges and Company, all of whom were friends of Governor Cornbury. It was meant to encompass an area of between 60,000 and 350,000 acres (1,400 km^{2}), depending on the final location of the border. In 1704, the larger Minisink Patent was granted to Matthew Ling and Company, again friends and supporters of Lord Cornbury. This patent included 160,000 acres (650 km^{2}) of disputed territory. The much smaller Cheescocks Patent was granted in 1707. To symbolize New York's commitment to control over this area, Orange County, New York, was established in 1709.

In 1705, Peter Fauconnier, a Collector and Receiver General in New Jersey, reported to Lord Cornbury that those living along the border were, "neither here nor there" in relation to their residency. Fauconnier wrote Lord Cornbury again on April 2, 1709, and went into more details about the problems of the border region. He reported that citizens were being taxed twice, and being required to serve in each colony's militia. He also reported that squatters and other illegal users of land were finding the confusion along the border beneficial to them, but that presence was not beneficial to either colony.

Increasing confusion, however, did not result in less settlement along the border. The Wawayanda Patent was first settled by Christopher Denn in 1712, and by 1716 the Minisink Patent (Walpack as it was known in New Jersey) had attracted enough settlers to support the first clergyman.

== Pressure to resolve the dispute ==
In March 1717, James Alexander became Surveyor of New Jersey, Receiver of Quit Rents for East New Jersey, and Advocate General. Alexander owned 1,000 acres (4.0 km^{2}) along the disputed boundary. He wrote to friends in England about the great potential he saw for the Colony of New Jersey and his worry about the threat posed by the border dispute. He became a leader in the East Jersey Proprietor's efforts to have the border decided in a favorable manner.

In 1717, New York's Governor Hunter decided the time had come to reduce tensions and resolve the dispute over the border. He inserted a provision in New York's 1717 debt bill providing authorization for an official survey of the line, as long as an agreement could be reached with New Jersey over the line's exact location. Minisink patentees Peter Schuyler. (the son of Arent) and Stephan DeLancey unsuccessfully attempted to defeat the debt bill, and thus this provision, because of the expense to taxpayers. In addition, a group of London merchants petitioned the King, because they believed the loss of any part of New York would cause harm to their business. It was always easier to trade with a Royal Colony, and they reminded the King that he would lose some of his quit rents, and that the Minisink Patent was becoming an important part of the New York colony. Their attempt to hinder the debt bill would also fail.

On April 19–20, 1717, Governor Hunter addressed the New Jersey Assembly. He told them of his efforts to end the dispute and of the debt bill's passage by the New York Assembly. He was empowered by New York to appoint commissioners and to solicit New Jersey's support in settling this matter. Hunter explained that his goal was "to prevent future Disputes and Disquiet and to do Justice to the Proprietors on the Borders of both a like law for that purpose is the necessary Line." The New Jersey Legislature, on March 27, 1719, passed "An Act for Running and Ascertaining the Division Line betwixt this Province and the Province of New York."

New Jersey appointed Dr. John Johnston, George Willocks and James Alexander. (who would take charge of the expedition) as commissioners. They were charged with determining the true north point of the Duke of York's deed of 1664. The New York Assembly also appointed commissioners, naming Allane Jarrat as their head, and charged them to:

find out that place of the said northernmost branch of Delaware River that lies in the latitude of forty-one degrees and forty minutes, which is the north partition point of New York and New Jersey.

This charge was far more specific than New Jersey's and left Allane Jarrat in the limited position of having to place the northern station point at 41°40′, and not at the location of the northernmost branch of the entire Delaware River. The King's approval of the 1717 debt bill had not yet been granted, but Governor Hunter, believing that much had already been done, allowed the expedition to begin. He also left for London in June 1719, to help assure the bill's passage.

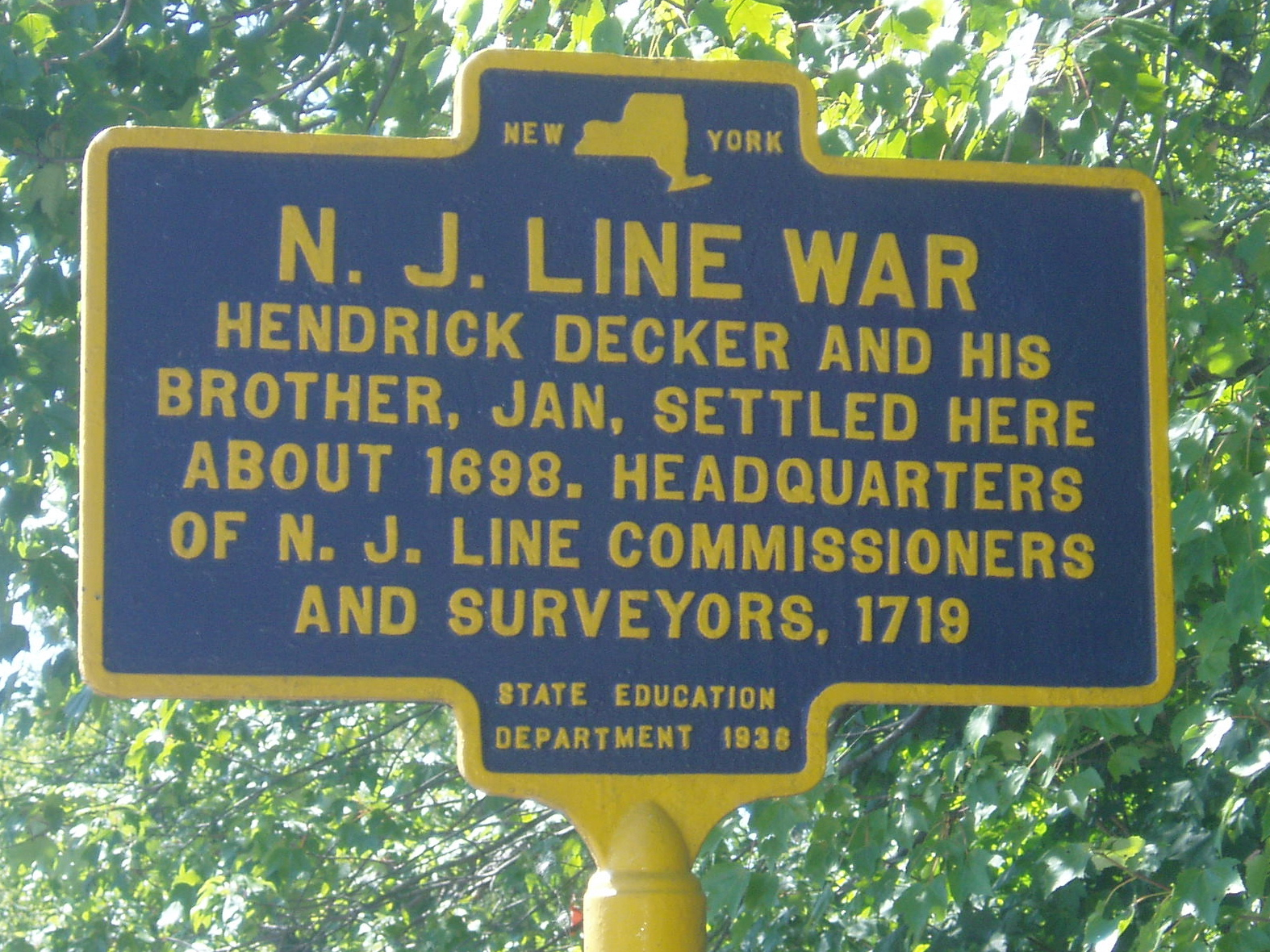
Headquarters historic marker near Port Jervis

Both colonies' commissioners met on June 22, 1719, at a location on the Delaware River. According to recorded reports, Allane Jarrat was uncooperative from the very beginning. John Reading, one of the commission's surveyors, reported in his journal on June 30:

This morning instead of proceeding in their former traverses Capt. Jarrard wholly declined the same alleging that he could not undergo the fateaque thereof (altho' what he had experienced was very small to what I apprehended the event would be)

Even with Jarrat's lack of cooperation, the final camp was reached on July 8, at a location on the Delaware 35 miles (56 km) north of the "Mahakkamack" branch. By July 17, 1719, a sub-expedition led by Captain Harrison, which had been investigating the Delaware River for branches farther north, arrived at the camp and reported that no substantial northerly branch of the River had been found. However, they had found the small Popaxtun Branch, with modern coordinates at 41°55′. On July 18, the entire effort of the expedition was threatened by a dispute between Jarrat and Alexander. Reading's Journal reports:

in the morning the surveyors disagreed concerning the use of tables for calculating the suns and stars place and if that they had not been there they had certainly left the station unfixed, which after a great many arguments they agreed to settle, a memorandum of which was taken and brought down.

Things did not improve for the Commissioners but only worsened as they were exposed to verbal abuse by New York settlers on July 22, 1719. But the commissioners were able to arrive at a final agreement on July 25, which came to be known as the "Tri Partite Deed". This agreement placed the northern station point upstream of an Indian village known as Casheightouch, today known as Cochecton, New York. The latitude was determined to be 41°40′ at this location and the surveyors accepted the "Fishkill" (which was actually the main Delaware River north of the Mackhackimack branch) as being the most northernmost branch of the river. This was an apparent concession to New York and the charge under which Jarrat was working, since the smaller Popaxtun branch had actually been farther north. The "Tri Partite Deed" was signed two days later on July 27, 1719, along the Hudson River, after surveys placed the eastern station point 5 miles (8.0 km) north of Tappan Creek (figure 2). But before the final survey of the agreed line could be completed Mr. Walter, one of the New York Commissioners, reported feeling ill. The expedition was suspended until September, with many of New York's commissioners proceeding on to New York City.

== New York's change of heart ==
In the city the commissioners spoke to several of their friends who had property along the border, among them Stephan DeLancey, Lancaster Symes and Henry Wileman. The commissioners reported to these men that the line they had agreed to in the "Tri Partite Deed" would result in the loss to New York of a large chunk of the Minisink and Wawayanda patents, along with the town of Orangetown (later known as Tappan) and most of the Kakiate and Cheescock patents. On August 20 these important men, possessing early first hand knowledge of the agreement, petitioned the New York Council President, Peter Schuyler, for compensatory lands for their expected losses if this boundary line was accepted by the Council.

But the initial request for compensation quickly changed into a request that New York fight to keep the land that would be lost to the "Tri Partite Deed." Allane Jarrat, in early September 1719, informed the Council of New York that the surveying instruments used on the expedition were actually inaccurate, and that his conscience would not allow him to accept the "Tri Partite Deed". According to the petition, Jarrat felt unwilling "to relye on my own judgement in so weighty and affair that so highly concerns the care of this province for Taphan and sundry other Gentlemens estates." The petition requested advice from the Council on how to proceed with the agreement now that these errors had been made public.

On the same day that Jarrat's petition was submitted to the Council, another was also received from "severall (of) the Inhabitants of the province of New York for themselves and others, owners and proprietors of land Bordering upon the Partition Line between the province of New York and New Jersey." This second petition, supported Jarrat's contentions, reminded the Council of the 1694 agreement between Governors Hamilton and Fletcher (placing the east station point at Tappan Creek), accused Captain Harrison of lying when he reported there were no other branches farther north on the Delaware, and requested that the final survey be held up until the King decided on the legitimacy of the 1717 debt bill. As a final gesture, the petitioners offered to pay half the cost for a more accurate surveying instrument. This petition was signed by 43 people. Among the signers were DeLancey, Wileman, Symes, the captain of the Orange County Militia, the Orange County High Sheriff, and two of Orange County's Representatives to the Assembly. These were all powerful and influential men in the colony of New York, all of whom could easily make life difficult for Allane Jarrat.

The coincidence of these petitions arriving on the same day, clearly indicates that these important gentlemen, alarmed that they could lose property rights to land that was theirs as long as a disputed boundary line was placed farther south, must have convinced Jarrat to back out of an already signed agreement with the other commissioners. There was clearly a conspiracy now under way to defeat the "Tri Partite Deed". With Governor Hunter in London, Peter Schuyler, along with other powerful New York leaders, was able to take control of the situation, and swing matters in his favor.

The concerns of these New York gentlemen were fueled by their increasing awareness that the disputed border lands were rich in iron ore, water power, and charcoal yielding forests. The Council of New York passed a resolution on September 29 which stated:

we cannot advise your honor, to order the said Surveyor to proceed and fix the said latitude by this instrument; but rather, that he should be directed to set forth and certify by some instrument, under his hand and Seal, that the Station pretended to be fixt at the Fishkill, is wrong and erroneous, to the End this province may not, at any time hereafter, receive and Prefudice by the aforesaid tripartite Indenture ... and that all farther proceedings ought to be staid until a correct and large instrument, be procured for setting the said station.

Not only did this resolution tell Jarrat to back out of the "Tri Partite Deed", but it also instructed him to prove that the station point along the Fishkill was incorrect.

== New Jersey's reaction ==
The East New Jersey Board of Proprietors were both shocked and angered by what was happening in New York. Referring to Jarrat in a letter to the Board, James Alexander wrote that "I could scarely think he was earnst" in writing his petition to the Council. The Board's concern also centered around the difficulty of finding a more accurate surveying instrument. John Barclay wrote to Lewis Morris on this topic, noting that: "It is impossible for the 'Art of Man,' to make an instrument perfectly true and correct, and if the line be stay'd till one be certified to be so ... it will be stay'd for ever."

In response to New York's actions, the East New Jersey Board of Proprietors, on September 29, 1719, wrote to Robert Morris about their concern that the effort to finally establish the disputed border could be stopped:

upon the groundless, weak, and untrue suggestions of the petitioners, and the visionary whim and cant of the surveyor; after the same had been directed to be done by the legislature of both Provinces, and commissioners had been appointed under the Great Seal of each of than that purpose; and had made (at a very great expense) so considerable profit.

In this same letter the East New Jersey Proprietors presented their positions on the circumstances which had led to the "Tri Partite Deed" agreement. Below is a summary of some of these positions:

1. New York was wrong concerning the reported inaccuracy of the tables used by the Duke of York to establish the latitude of the northern station point. His tables had actually been quite reliable, and the Duke was fully aware of the consequences of his actions which is indicated by him setting the latitude so exactly.
2. Had there actually been a branch farther north on the Delaware it would have certainly been reported by Harrison, since it would have been in New Jersey's favor. If the small Poxitun branch had actually been proclaimed the northernmost branch, New Jersey would have gained an additional 300,000 acres. Captain Harrison was also not the first to look for other major branches along the Delaware and not find any.
3. The establishment of the eastern station point at Tappan Creek in the letter between Governors Hamilton and Fletcher was very weak, since it had actually been written almost seven years after the original survey had been completed. Additionally, the station established in 1684, located farther north, had been identified by utilizing a highly accurate six foot surveying instrument.
4. The error in the instruments, if it actually existed, could have been just as easily to the south as to the north, and the possibility of finding a more accurate instrument was highly unlikely.
5. The original 1717 debt bill, used as the basis for enabling legislation, was not beyond either colony's jurisdiction to enact.
6. Governor Dongan of New York had illegally given away property at Tappan in order to establish a de facto claim to the area.
7. Allane Jarrat had lied, and had not even been present at the taking of the final measurements along the Hudson. James Alexander had reported that Jarrat never claimed that the errors in the survey could not be corrected, and even though he had been difficult to work with throughout the expedition, at its completion he had been satisfied with all the measurements made before departing for New York City.

This letter ended by suggesting that an investigation be begun immediately to examine the entire case and to report the results to the Board as soon as was possible. While no actual investigation ever occurred, evidence was produced showing that some of the monies allocated for the New York expedition had been improperly used, but nothing much came of this report either. In November 1719, Allane Jarrat was compensated for his assistance in stopping the "Tri Partite Deed" by being named Surveyor General of New York and being granted several 100 acres (0.40 km^{2}) of land in western New York.

== Open warfare along the border ==
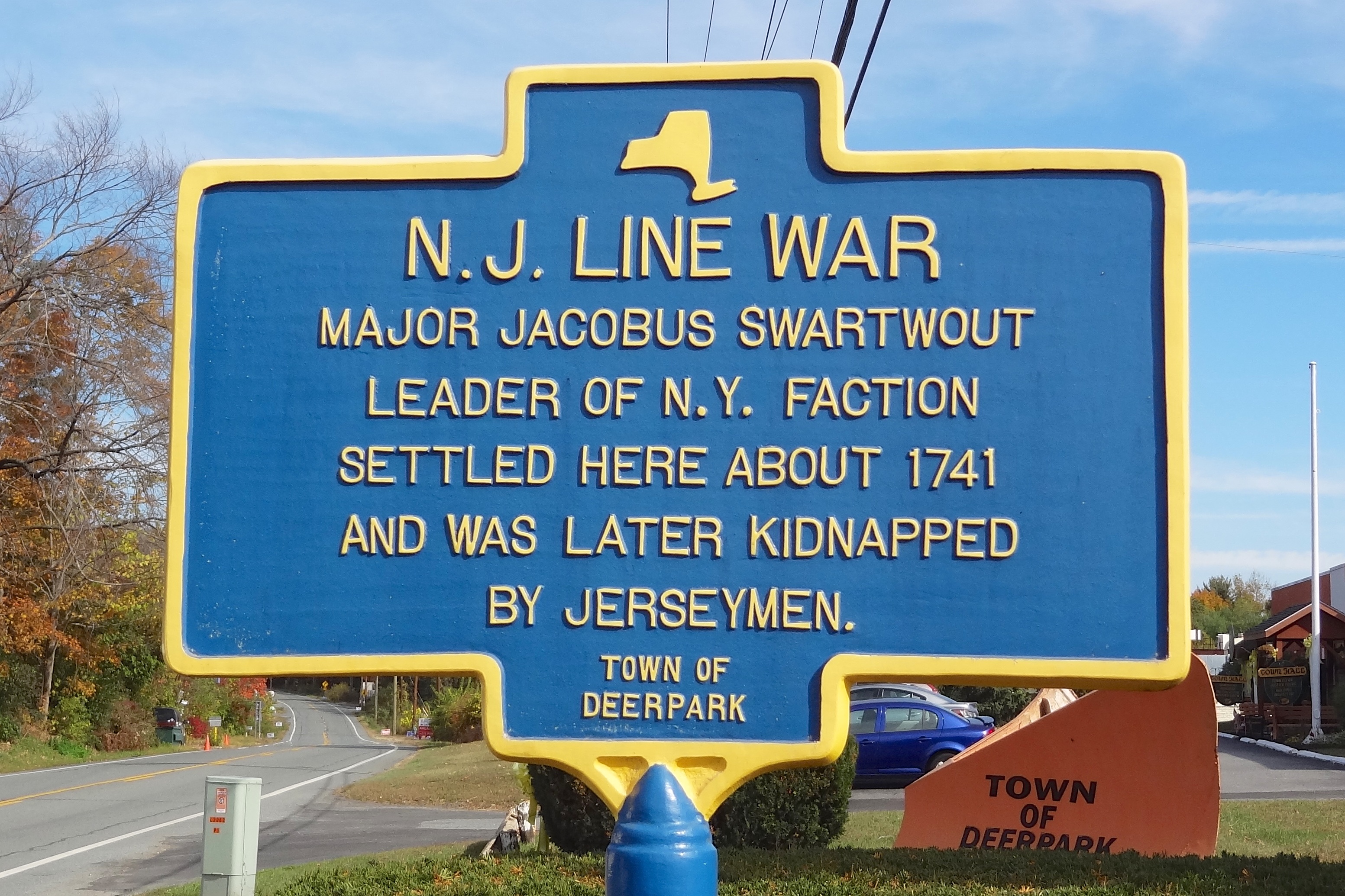
Line War: Major Jacobus Swartwout kidnapped

In 1720, the original 1717 debt bill, which had put these events in motion, was finally approved by the King. By this time the "Tri Partite Deed" was completely dead, and Hunter was no longer Governor. Not willing to give up until every possible solution had been exhausted, Robert Morris wrote to Peter Schuyler reminding him of the importance of exactly establishing and surveying the line; this was, he said, "Visible to all not willfully blind or whose frauds and Encroachments on either side have made it their interest to oppose it."

Tension along the border had now reached the boiling point, and open battles began to erupt along the border. By 1720, Thomas and Jacobus Swartwout of New York and John and Nicholas Westphalia of New Jersey were alternately burning each other's crops, claiming the others did not have proper title to their lands. This minor battle and many far worse would erupt over the next 49 years, until a final line was drawn by royal commission in 1769. During these years New York would continue to maneuver endlessly to stall the final decision. Every legal impediment was brought to bear, and the entire dispute was eventually thrown into the hands of the Board of Trade in London where it would sit for years. New Jersey would never quite gain the necessary strength to defeat New York and establish the border they believed was rightfully theirs.

== See also ==
- Border between West Jersey and East Jersey
- Ellis Island
- Liberty Island

== Sources ==
- Board of General Proprietors of the Eastern Division of New Jersey (1753–1755). The memorial of the Council of General Proprietors of the Eastern Division of New Jersey. New York: Printed by J. Parker and W. Weyman.
- Brush, Ted, "Sussex County, New Jersey," The North Jersey Highlander, North Jersey Highlands Historical Society, (Fall 1974)
- Calendar of Sussex County, History, New Jersey. Newton, N.J.: Newton Trust Co. 1919.
- Chance, Jack,"There Was a Crooked Line," The North Jersey Highlander, North Jersey Highlands Historical Society, (Fall 1978), 27–31.
- Cuddeback, William L., "New York – New Jersey State Boundary Line Controversy," Paper presented before Middletown and Wallkill Precinct Historical Society, Sussex County Historical Society, Minisink Valley Historical Society, on July 20, 1927, at High Point, New Jersey.
- Cummings, Warren D. Sussex County A History. 2nd ed. Newton, N.J.: Rotary Club of Newton, 1984.
- Hirsh, Kenneth, " A History of West Milford Township," The North Jersey Highlander, North Jersey Highlands Historical Society, (Summer 1969), 9–16.
- Lawrence, M.M. (1889). The Boundary Line and Other Bits of Biography and History. Deckertown, N.J.: Press of Sussex Independent.
- Reading, John (1719). "Copy of Journal of John Reading, While Surveying Lands in the Northern Part of New Jersey, June 22 to July 29, 1719". Proceedings of the New Jersey Historical Society, (January, July, and October 1915). Vol. X.
- Schwarz, Philip J. (1979). The Jarring Interests: New York's Boundary Makers 1664–1776. Albany: University of New York Press.
- Snell, P. J. History of Sussex and Warren Counties N.J. with Illustrations and Biographical Sketches of its Prominent Men and Pioneers. Philadelphia: Evert and Peck, 1881.
- Snyder, John F. (1969). The Story of New Jersey's Civil Boundaries 1606–1968 (PDF). Trenton, N.J.: Bureau of Geology and Topography.
- Wacker, Peter O. (1975). Land and People: A Cultural Geography of Preindustrial New Jersey. New Brunswick, N.J.: Rutgers University Press.
- Whitehead, William, ed. Documents Relating to the Colonial History of the State of New Jersey. Vols. 1–2. Newark: 1880.
- Whitehead, William, ed. Documents Relating to the Colonial History of the State of New Jersey. vols. 3–4. Newark: 1881.
- Whitehead, William (1859). Northern Boundary Line: The Circumstances Leading to the Establishment in 1769, on the Northern Boundary Line Between New Jersey and New York.
