= YMCA of Greater New York =

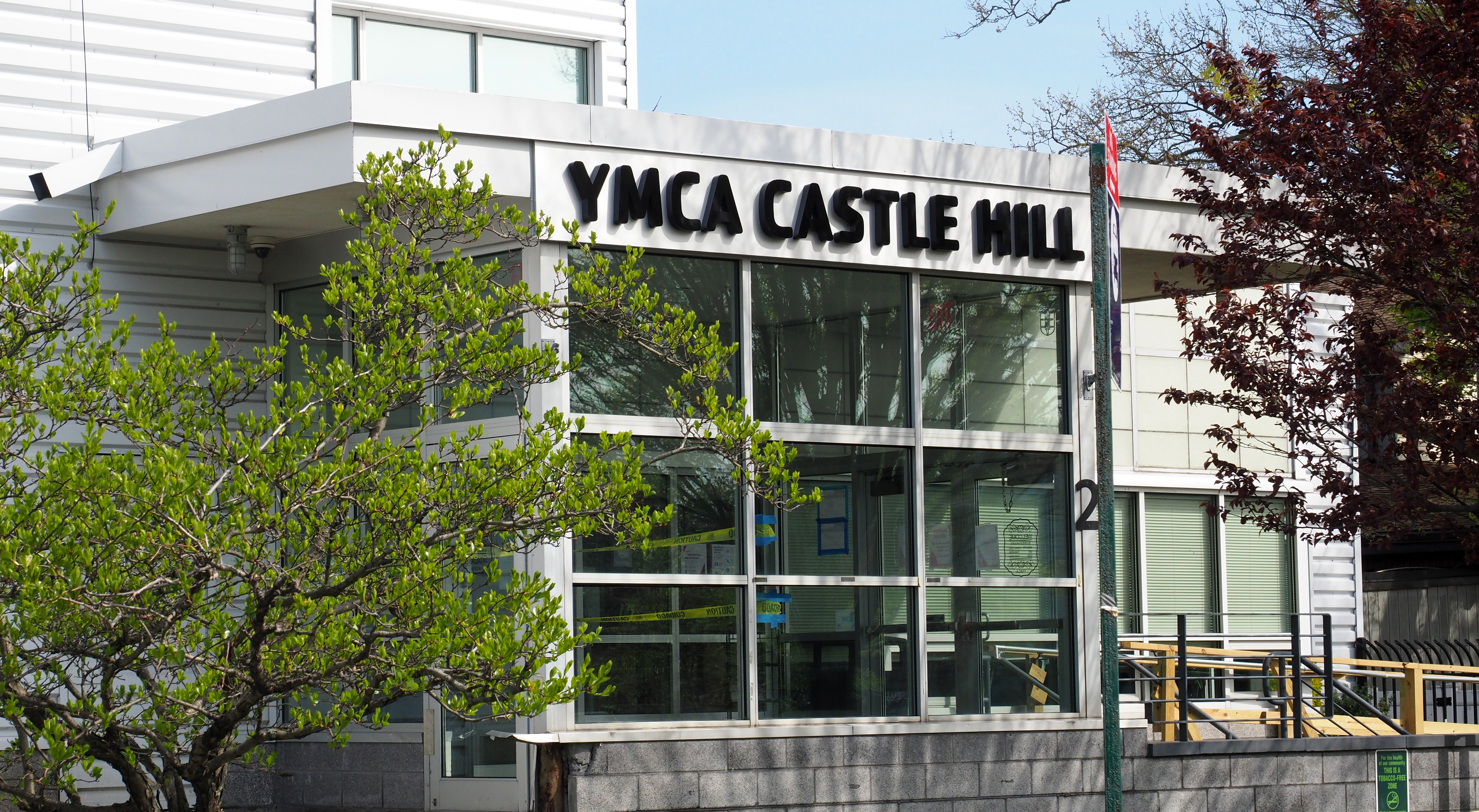
- Castle Hill YMCA, Bronx, NY
- Formation: 1852; 174 years ago
- Headquarters: New York City
- Location: United States
- Board Chair: Sandie O’Connor
- Website: https://ymcanyc.org/

YMCA of Greater New York is a community service organization, the largest YMCA in North America and also New York City's largest private youth-serving organization serving more than five hundred thousand each year.

The New York chapter formed in 1852 when a number of men met in what is now Soho to help new immigrant arrivals to the city, and the Brooklyn branch was established the following year with Walt Whitman as an early member. As of 2021, there are twenty-two branches throughout the five boroughs, including the McBurney Y that was the inspiration for the Village People's song and the West Side YMCA.

YMCA of Greater New York is affiliated with YMCA in America and also operated Camp Talcott, a more than century-old sleepaway camp that hosted more than one thousand campers each summer.
