= Electro-music =

Electronic music festival in Huguenot, New York, USA

electro-music
- Genre: Electronic dance music
- Location: Huguenot, New York
- Years active: 2005-present
- Website: Electro-music Festival

The electro-music music festival is a festival and conference devoted to experimental electronic music . Since 2005, it has been held in Huguenot, New York. The annual electro-music festival, known as the "Woodstock of electronic music," bills itself as "the world's premiere event for experimental electronic music". The gathering features three days of electronic music concerts, seminars, workshops, demonstrations, jam sessions, video art, a laptop battle, and a swap-meet.

== See also ==
- List of electronic music festivals
