= Hudson Van Etten =

American seaman (1874–1941)

- Born: May 17, 1874; Port Jervis, New York, US
- Died: October 27, 1941 (aged 67)
- Military career
- Allegiance: United States of America
- Branch: United States Navy
- Rank: Seaman
- Unit: U.S.S. Nashville
- Conflicts: Spanish–American War
- Awards: Medal of Honor

Hudson Van Etten (May 17, 1874 – October 27, 1941) was a seaman serving in the United States Navy during the Spanish–American War who received the Medal of Honor for bravery.

== Biography ==
Van Etten was born on May 17, 1874, in Port Jervis, New York to Hudson Van Etten and Lydia Cuddeback Van Etten. His father committed suicide when he was six years old.

After enlisting in the U.S. Navy he was sent to fight in the Spanish–American War aboard the gunboat USS Nashville as a seaman.

In 1914 he married Margaret Louise Van Etten at Port Jervis, New York. They had four sons.

He died on October 27, 1941.

== Medal of Honor citation ==
Rank and organization: Seaman, U.S. Navy. Born: 17 May 1874, Port Jervis, N.J. Accredited to: New Jersey. G.O. No.: 521, 7 July 1899.

Citation:

On board the U.S.S. Nashville during the operation of cutting the cable leading from Cienfuegos, Cuba, 11 May 1898. Facing the heavy fire of the enemy, Van Etten displayed extraordinary bravery and coolness throughout this period.

== See also ==
- List of Medal of Honor recipients for the Spanish–American War
