= Port Jervis, New York =

Port Jervis
- City
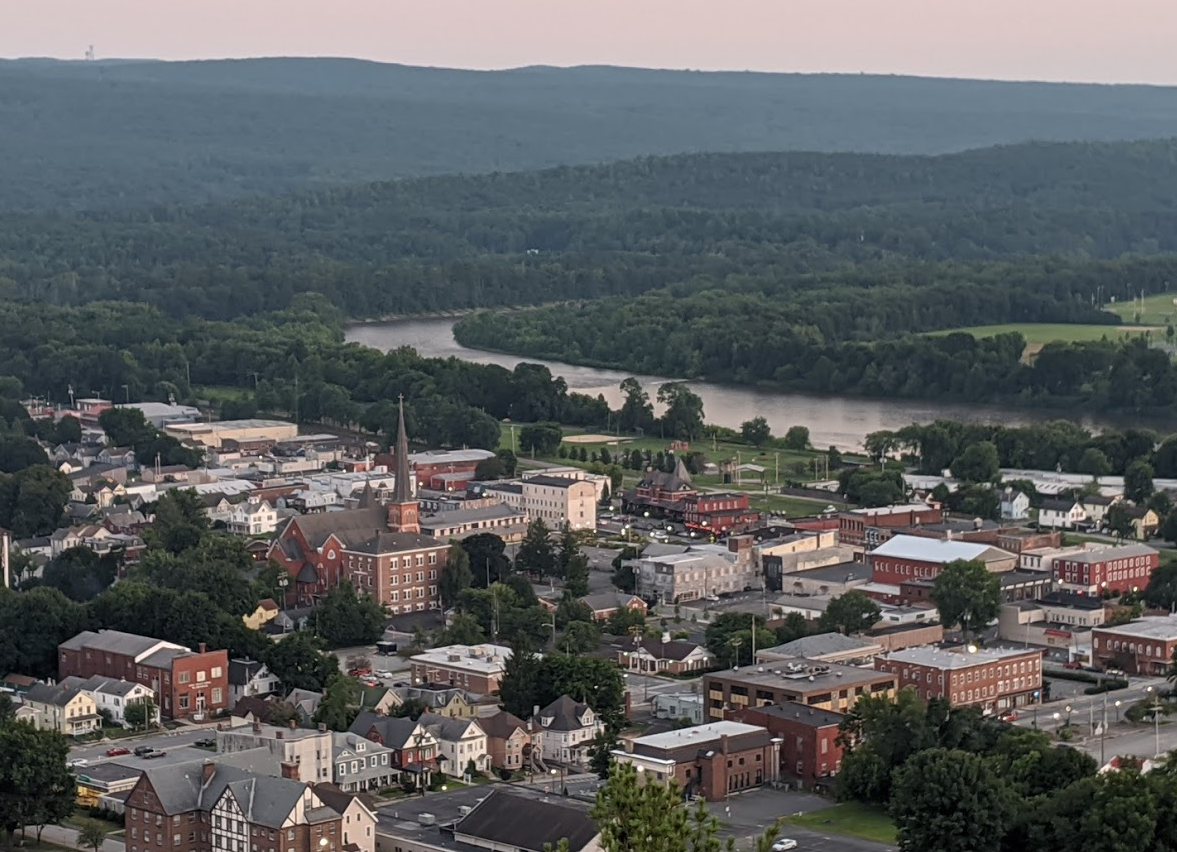
- View of Port Jervis, taken from Elks-Brox Park

- Seal
- Motto: Gateway to the Upper Delaware River
- Interactive map of Port Jervis
- Coordinates: 41°22′N 74°41′W
- Country: United States
- State: New York
- County: Orange
- Settled: 1690; 336 years ago
- Incorporated (village): 1853; 173 years ago
- Incorporated (city): 1907; 119 years ago
- Named for: John B. Jervis

Government
  - Type: Mayor–council
  - Mayor: Dominic Cicalese (R)
  - Councilman at Large: Michael Hockenberry (R)

Area
  - Total: 2.70 sq mi (7.00 km^{2})
  - Land: 2.53 sq mi (6.55 km^{2})
  - Water: 0.17 sq mi (0.44 km^{2}) 6.64%
- Elevation: 400 ft (122 m)

Population (2020)
  - Total: 8,775
  - Density: 3,468.6/sq mi (1,339.24/km^{2})
- Time zone: UTC−5 (EST)
  - Summer (DST): UTC−4 (EDT)
- ZIP Code: 12771
- Area code: 845
- FIPS code: 36-59388
- GNIS feature ID: 0960971
- Website: www.portjervisny.gov

Port Jervis is a city located at the confluence of the Neversink and Delaware rivers in western Orange County, New York, United States, north of the Delaware Water Gap. Its population was 8,775 at the 2020 census. The communities of Deerpark, Huguenot, Sparrowbush, and Greenville are adjacent to Port Jervis. Matamoras, Pennsylvania, is across the river and connected by the Mid-Delaware Bridge. Montague Township, New Jersey, also borders the city. The Tri-States Monument, marking the tripoint between New York, New Jersey, and Pennsylvania, lies at the southwestern corner of the city.

Port Jervis was part of early industrial history, a point for shipping coal to major markets to the southeast by canal and later by railroads. Its residents had long-distance passenger service by railroad until 1970. The restructuring of railroads resulted in a decline in the city's business and economy.

In the 21st century, from late spring to early fall, many thousands of travelers and tourists pass through Port Jervis on their way to enjoying rafting, kayaking, canoeing and other activities in the Delaware Water Gap National Recreation Area and the Upper Delaware Scenic and Recreational River and the surrounding area.

Port Jervis is part of the Kiryas Joel–Poughkeepsie–Newburgh metropolitan area as well as the larger New York metropolitan area. In August 2008, Port Jervis was named one of "Ten Coolest Small Towns" by Budget Travel magazine.

== History ==
The first fully developed European settlement in the area was established by Dutch and English colonists c.1690, and a land grant of 1,200 acres (490 ha) was formalized on October 14, 1697. The settlement was originally known as Mahackamack, after a Lenape word. It was raided and burned in 1779 during the American Revolutionary War, by British and Mohawk forces under the command of Mohawk leader Joseph Brant before the Battle of Minisink. Over the next two decades, residents rebuilt the settlement. They developed more roadways to better connect Mahackamack with the eastern parts of Orange County.

After the Delaware and Hudson Canal was opened in 1828, providing transportation of coal from northeastern Pennsylvania to New York and New England via the Hudson River, trade attracted money and further development to the area. A village was incorporated on May 11, 1853. It was renamed as Port Jervis in the mid-19th century, after John Bloomfield Jervis, chief engineer of the D&H Canal. Port Jervis grew steadily into the 1900s, and on July 26, 1907, it became a city.

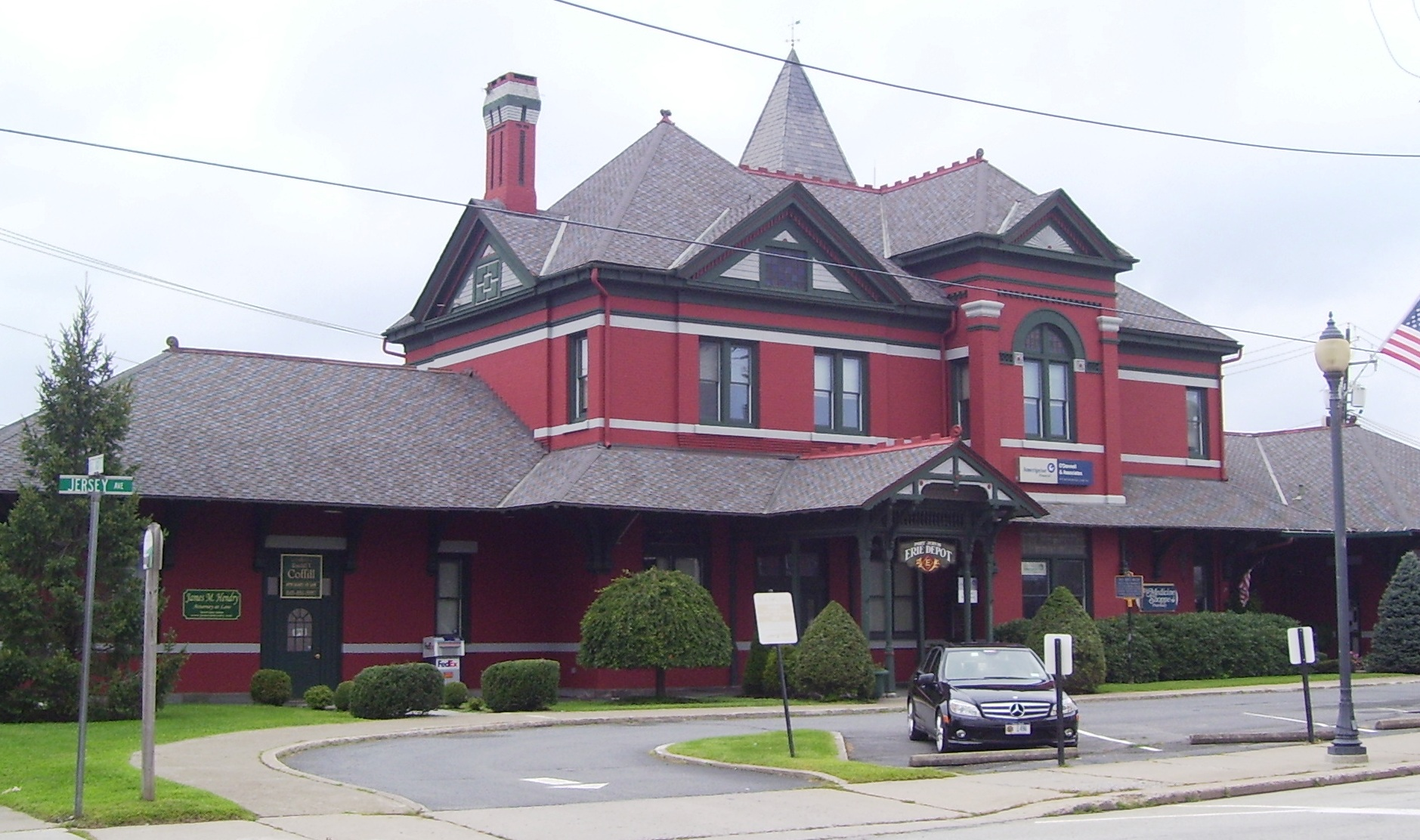
The Erie Depot, built in 1892, was the largest station on the Erie Railroad's Delaware Division. The Erie ceased long-distance passenger service in 1970. The depot was recently restored and houses some retail shops.

=== Coming of the railroad ===
The first rail line to run through Port Jervis was the New York & Erie Railroad, which in 1832 was chartered to run from Piermont, New York, on the Hudson River in Rockland County, to Lake Erie. Ground was broken in 1835, but construction was delayed by a nationwide financial panic, and did not start again until 1838. The line was completed in 1851, and the first passenger train – with President Millard Fillmore and former United States Senator Daniel Webster on board – came through the city on May 14. The railroad went through a number of name changes, becoming the Erie Railroad in 1897.

A second railroad, the Port Jervis and Monticello Railroad, later leased to the New York, Ontario and Western Railway (O&W), opened in 1868, running northeast out of the city, and eventually connecting to Kingston, New York, Weehawken, New Jersey and eastern connections.

Like the D&H Canal, the railroads brought new prosperity to Port Jervis in the form of increased trade and investment in the community from the outside. However, the competition by the railroad, which could deliver products faster, hastened the decline of the canal, which ceased operation in 1898. The railroads were the basis of the city's economy for the coming decades. Port Jervis became Erie's division center between Jersey City, New Jersey and Susquehanna, Pennsylvania, and by 1922, 20 passenger trains went through the city every day. More than 2,500 Erie RR employees made their homes there.

The railroads began to decline after the Great Depression. A shift in transportation accelerated after World War II with the federal subsidy of the Interstate Highway System and increased competition from trucking companies. One of the first Class I railroads to shut down was the O&W, on March 29, 1957, leaving Port Jervis totally reliant on the Erie. A few years later, in 1960, the Erie, also on a shaky financial footing, merged with Delaware, Lackawanna and Western Railroad to become the Erie Lackawanna. Railroad restructuring continued and in 1976, the Erie Lackawana became part of Conrail, along with a number of other struggling railroads, such as the Penn Central. Since the breakup of Conrail, the trackage around Port Jervis has been controlled by Norfolk Southern. The decline of the railroads was an economic blow to Port Jervis. The city has struggled to find a new economic basis.

=== Lynching and Racist incidents ===
On June 2, 1892, Robert Lewis, an African American, was lynched, hanged on Main Street in Port Jervis by a mob after being accused of participation in an assault on a white woman. A grand jury indicted nine people for assault and rioting rather than Lewis's lynching. Some literary critics argue that this event influenced Stephen Crane's 1898 novella The Monster. Crane lived in Port Jervis from 1878 until 1883 and frequently visited the area from 1891 to 1897.

In the mid-1920s some residents in the area formed a Ku Klux Klan chapter, in the period of the KKK's early 20th-century revival. They burned crosses on Point Peter, the mountain peak that overlooks the city.

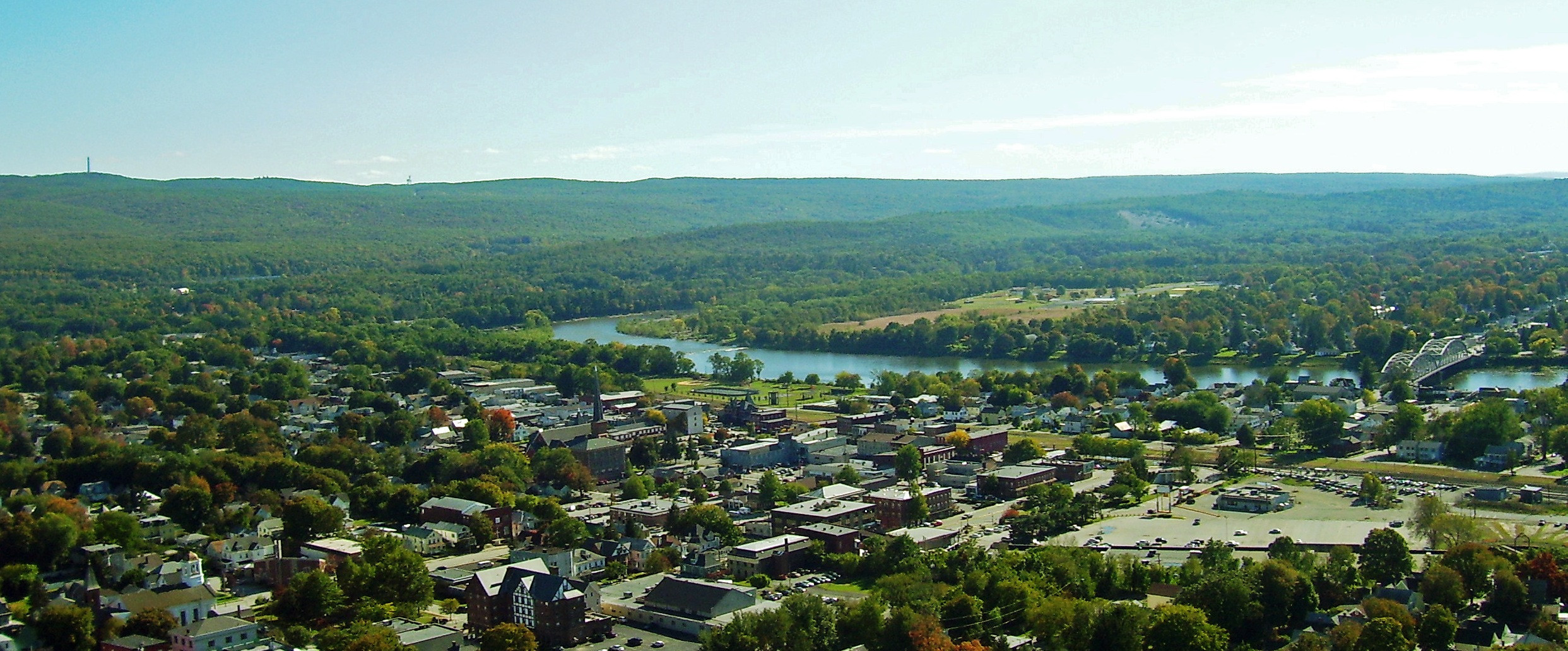
A view of Port Jervis showing the Mid-Delaware Bridge to Matamoras, Pennsylvania on the far right and New Jersey's High Point on the Kittatinny Ridge on the far left

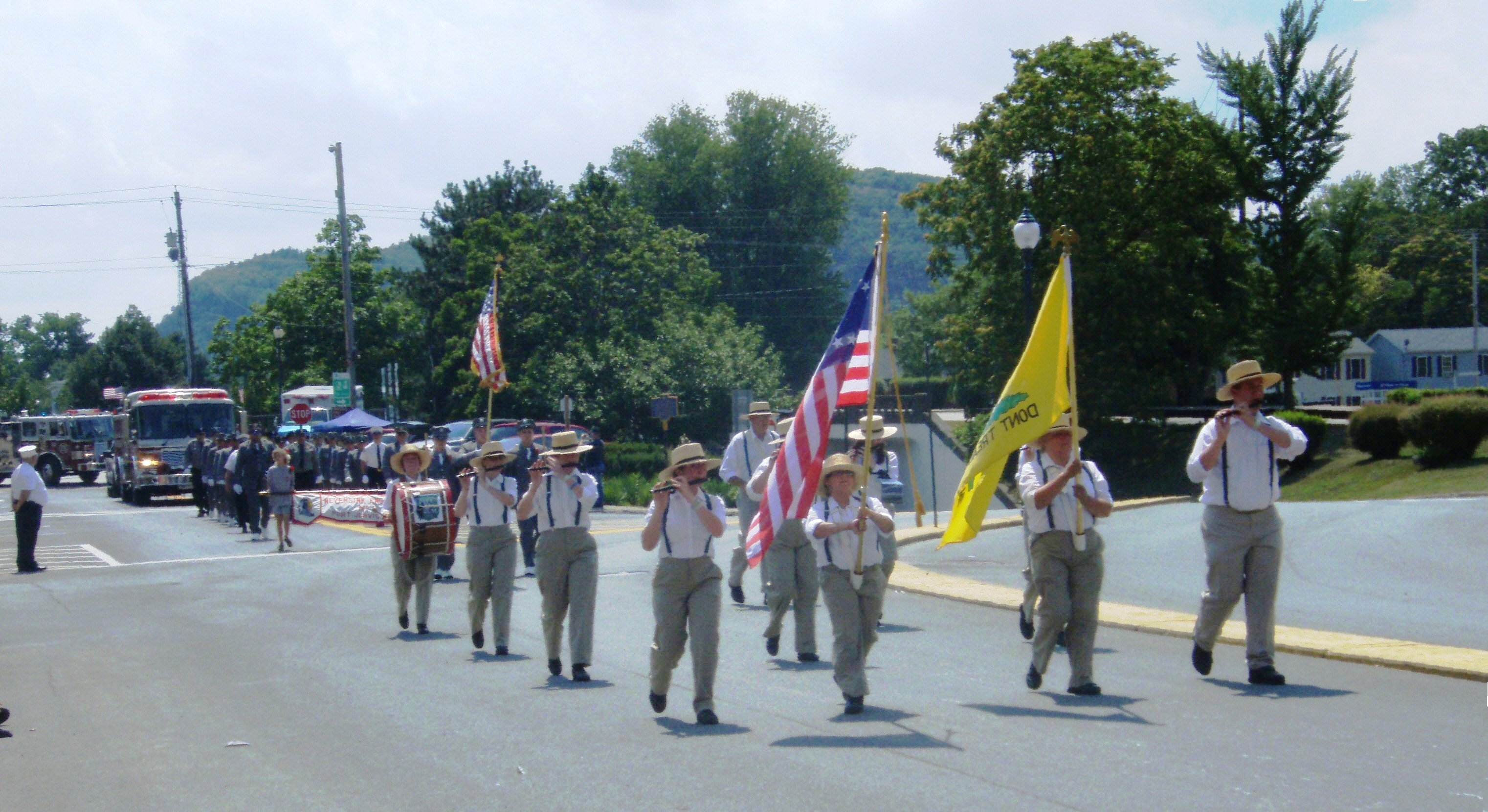
The parade on July 14, 2007, celebrating the 100th year as a city

=== Geological history ===
The city's location at the confluence of the Delaware and Neversink rivers has made it subject to occasional flooding. There was flooding during the 1955 Hurricane Diane, and a flood-related rumor started a panic in the population. This incident was studied and a 1958 report issued by the National Research Council: "The Effects of a Threatening Rumor on a Disaster-Stricken Community".

In addition to the rivers having flooded during periods of heavy rainfall, at times ice jams have effectively dammed the Delaware, also causing flooding. In 1875 ice floes destroyed the bridge to Matamoras, Pennsylvania. In 1981 a large ice floe resulted in the highest water crest measured to date at the National Weather Service's Matamoras river gauge 26.6 feet (8.1 m).

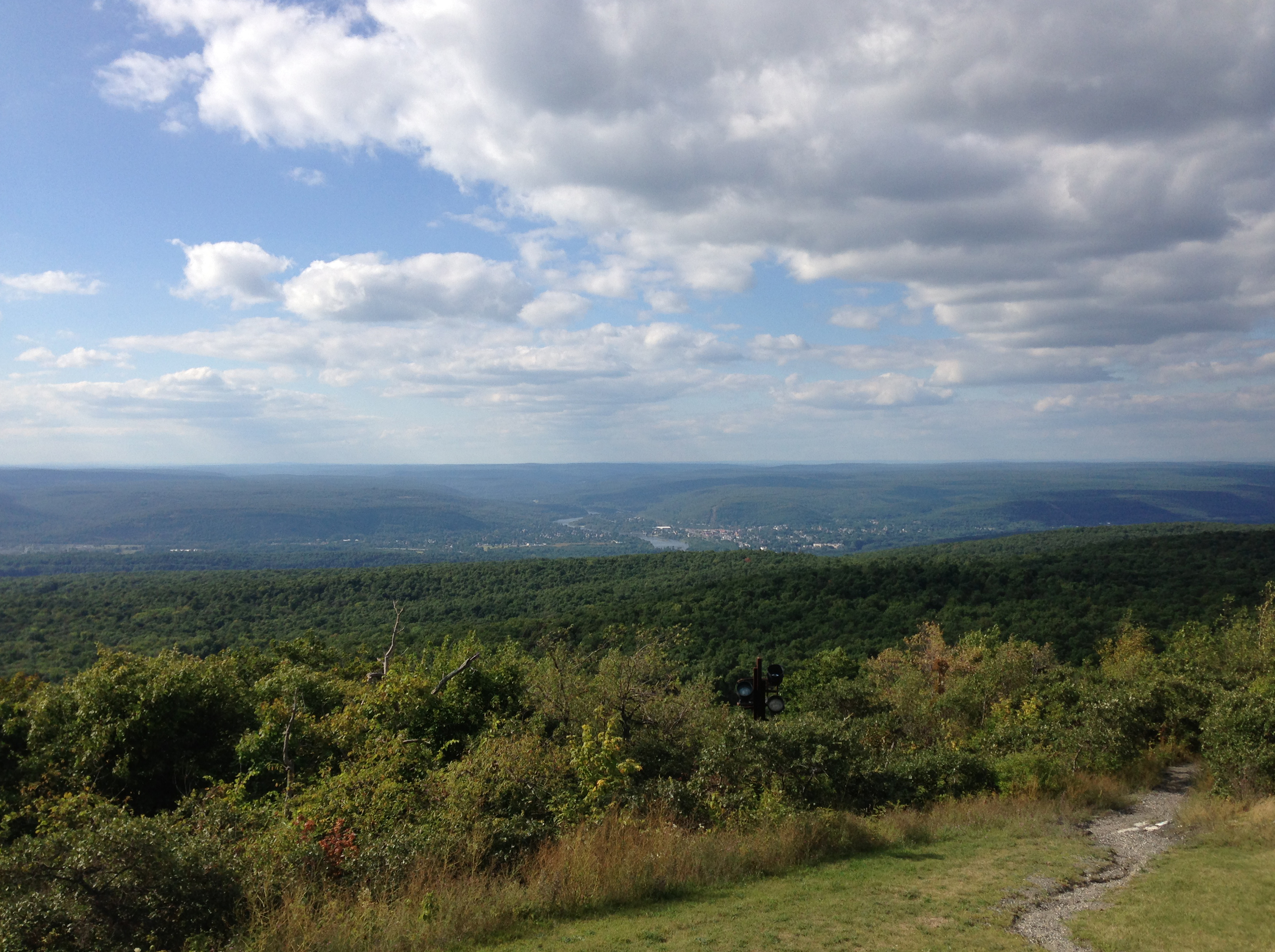
View of Port Jervis from High Point, New Jersey

== Geography ==
Port Jervis is located on the north bank of the Delaware River at the confluence where the Neversink River – the Delaware's largest tributary – empties into the larger river. Port Jervis is connected by the Mid-Delaware Bridge across the Delaware to Matamoras, Pennsylvania.

From here the Delaware flows to the southwest, running parallel to Kittatinny Ridge until reaching the Delaware Water Gap. It heads southeastward, continuing past New Hope, Pennsylvania and Lambertville, New Jersey; and the New Jersey capital, Trenton; to Philadelphia, and the Delaware Bay.

Port Jervis is also home to the tri-point between New York, Pennsylvania and New Jersey.

According to the United States Census Bureau, the city has a total area of 2.7 square miles (7.0 km^{2}), of which 2.5 square miles (6.5 km^{2}) is land and 0.2 square miles (0.52 km^{2}) (6.64%) is water.

=== Climate ===
Port Jervis has a Humid Continental Climate (Köppen Dfb) with relatively hot summers and cold winters. It receives approximately 47.18 inches (1,198 mm) of precipitation per year, most of which occurs in the late spring in early summer. Extremes range from −26 °F (−32 °C) on January 14, 1912, to 105 °F (40.5 °C) on July 9, 1936.

Climate data for Port Jervis, New York 1991–2022 normals, extremes 1893–present
Month	Jan	Feb	Mar	Apr	May	Jun	Jul	Aug	Sep	Oct	Nov	Dec	Year
Record high °F (°C)	71 (22)	75 (24)	88 (31)	96 (36)	98 (37)	102 (39)	105 (41)	103 (39)	103 (39)	93 (34)	85 (29)	73 (23)	105 (41)
Mean daily maximum °F (°C)	33.9 (1.1)	37.3 (2.9)	46.2 (7.9)	60.1 (15.6)	71.3 (21.8)	78.8 (26.0)	83.6 (28.7)	81.4 (27.4)	73.8 (23.2)	61.8 (16.6)	49.4 (9.7)	38.5 (3.6)	59.7 (15.4)
Daily mean °F (°C)	24.9 (−3.9)	27.1 (−2.7)	35.4 (1.9)	47.4 (8.6)	58.4 (14.7)	66.9 (19.4)	71.8 (22.1)	69.8 (21.0)	62.4 (16.9)	50.7 (10.4)	39.7 (4.3)	30.4 (−0.9)	48.7 (9.3)
Mean daily minimum °F (°C)	16.0 (−8.9)	17.0 (−8.3)	24.5 (−4.2)	34.7 (1.5)	45.6 (7.6)	55.0 (12.8)	60.0 (15.6)	58.3 (14.6)	51.0 (10.6)	39.6 (4.2)	30.1 (−1.1)	22.8 (−5.1)	37.8 (3.2)
Record low °F (°C)	−26 (−32)	−20 (−29)	−9 (−23)	8 (−13)	21 (−6)	34 (1)	39 (4)	33 (1)	21 (−6)	15 (−9)	1 (−17)	−20 (−29)	−26 (−32)
Average precipitation inches (mm)	3.07 (78)	2.63 (67)	3.66 (93)	3.78 (96)	3.58 (91)	4.72 (120)	4.72 (120)	4.64 (118)	4.54 (115)	4.67 (119)	3.27 (83)	3.90 (99)	47.18 (1,198)
Average precipitation days (≥ 0.01 in)	8.6	8.6	11.9	16.1	16.7	15.1	15.7	13.7	11.5	11.7	9.4	11.5	150.5
Source: NOAA Weather Atlas

== Demographics ==
Historical population
Census	Pop.	Note	%±
1870	6,377		—
1880	8,678		36.1%
1890	9,327		7.5%
1900	9,385		0.6%
1910	9,564		1.9%
1920	10,171		6.3%
1930	10,243		0.7%
1940	9,749		−4.8%
1950	9,372		−3.9%
1960	9,268		−1.1%
1970	8,852		−4.5%
1980	8,699		−1.7%
1990	9,060		4.1%
2000	8,860		−2.2%
2010	8,828		−0.4%
2020	8,775		−0.6%
U.S. Decennial Census

As of the census of 2000, there were 8,860 people, 3,533 households, and 2,158 families residing in the city. The population density was 3,500/sq mi (1,300/km^{2}). There were 3,851 housing units at an average density of 1,500/sq mi (590/km^{2}). The racial makeup of the city was 82.4% White, 8.2% African American, 0.59% Native American, 0.64% Asian, 0.02% Pacific Islander, 2.19% from other races, and 2.26% from two or more races. Hispanic or Latino of any race were 7.5% of the population.

There were 3,533 households, out of which 32.4% had children under the age of 18 living with them, 39.9% were married couples living together, 15.6% had a female householder with no husband present, and 38.9% were non-families. 32.6% of all households were made up of individuals, and 15.1% had someone living alone who was 65 years of age or older. The average household size was 2.48 and the average family size was 3.15.

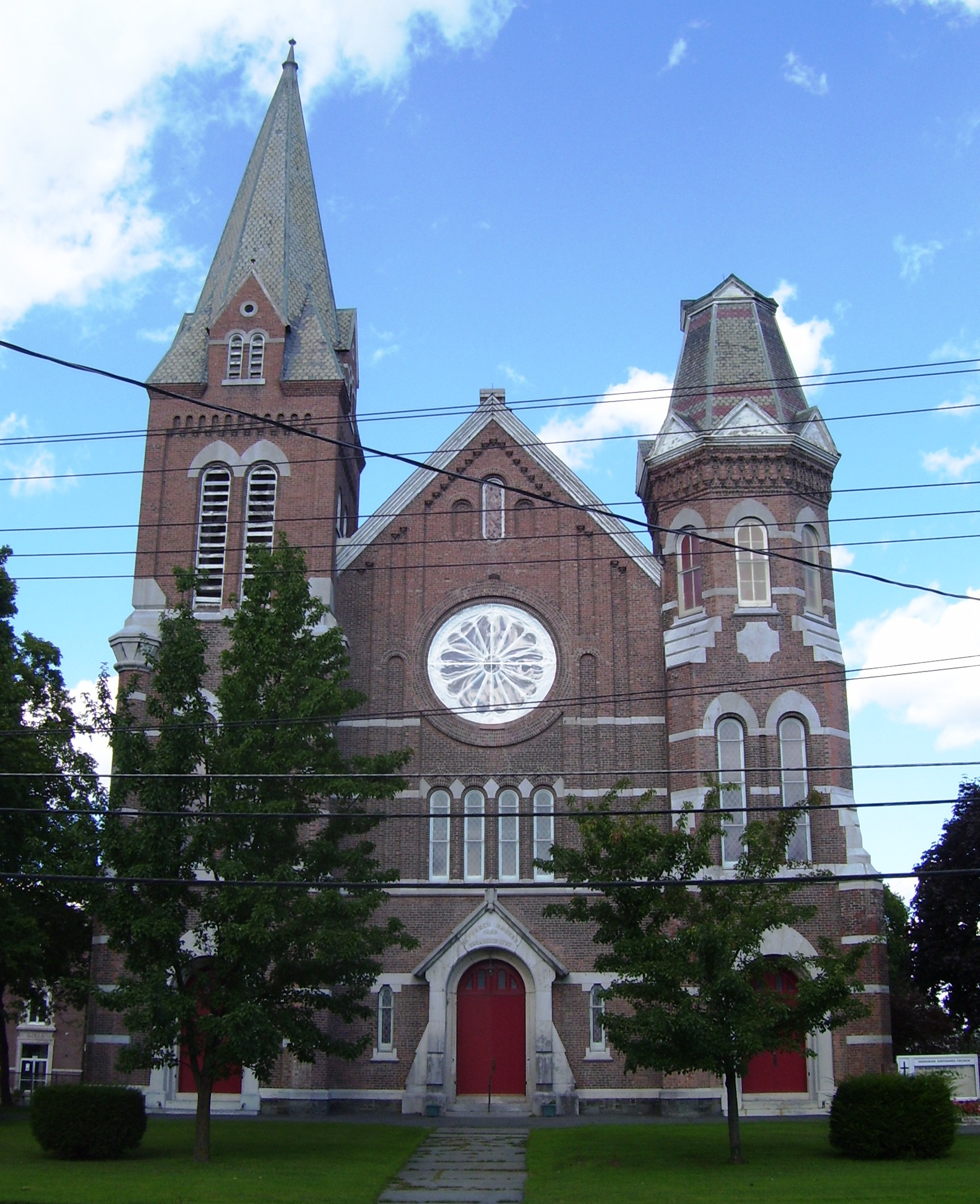
The Deerpark Reformed Church on East Main Street was originally organized in 1737, making it the oldest congregation in the area. The current building dates from 1838.

In the city, the age distribution of the population shows 27.8% under the age of 18, 8.4% from 18 to 24, 28.3% from 25 to 44, 20.3% from 45 to 64, and 15.2% who were 65 years of age or older. The median age was 36 years. For every 100 females, there were 91.4 males. For every 100 females age 18 and over, there were 86.0 males.

The median income for a household in the city was $30,241, and the median income for a family was $35,481. Males had a median income of $31,851 versus $22,274 for females. The per capita income for the city was $16,525. About 14.2% of families and 15.7% of the population were below the poverty line, including 25.5% of those under age 18 and 10.3% of those age 65 or over.

== Points of interest ==
=== State line monuments ===
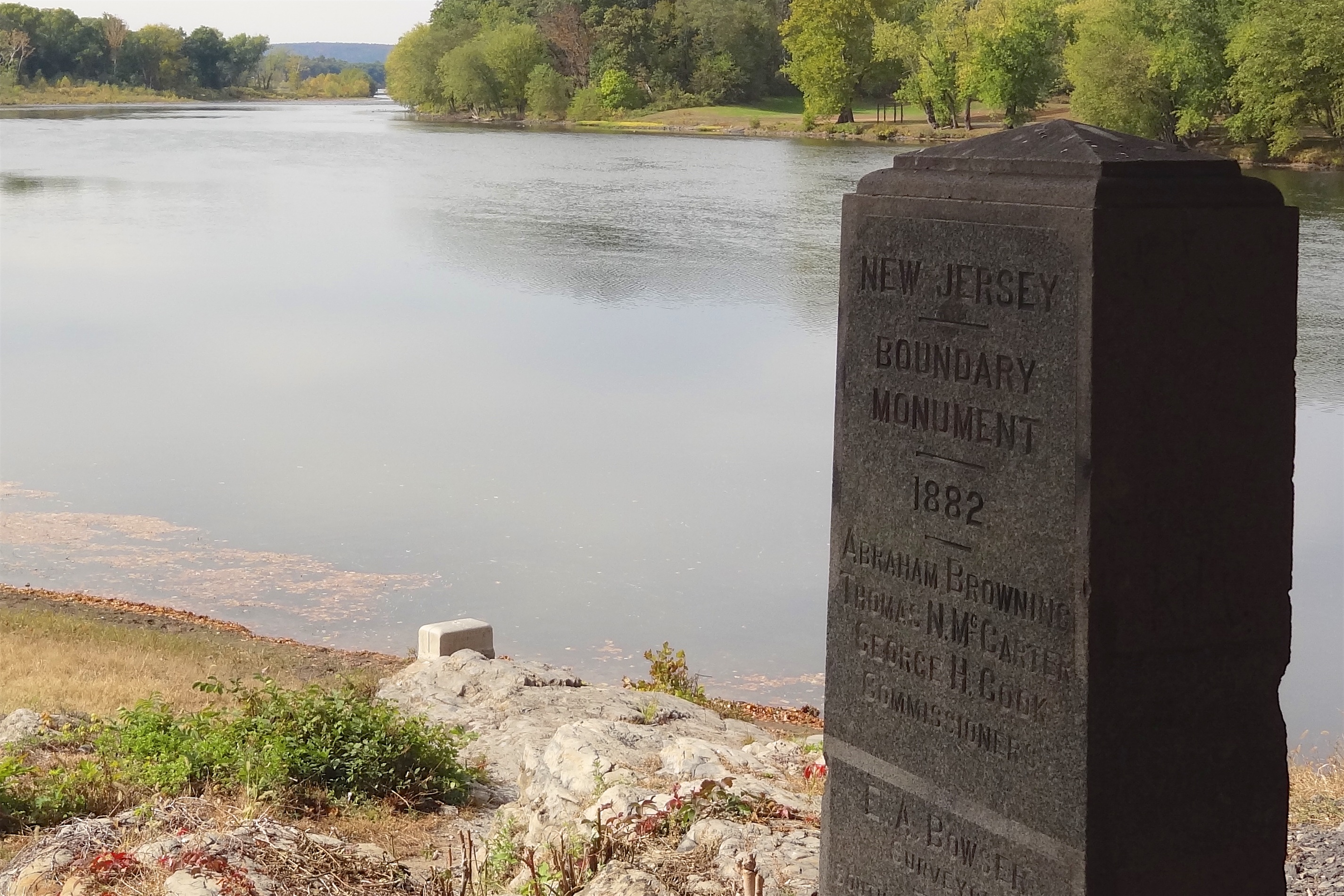
Overlooking the Tri-States Monument at the confluence of the Delaware and Neversink rivers from the Witness Monument

Port Jervis lies near the points where the states of New York, New Jersey and Pennsylvania come together. South of the Laurel Grove Cemetery, under the viaduct for Interstate 84, are two monuments marking the boundaries between the three states.

The larger monument is a granite pillar inscribed "Witness Monument". It is not on any boundary itself, but instead is a witness for two boundary points. On the north side (New York), it references the corner boundary point between New York and Pennsylvania that is located in the center of the Delaware River 475 feet (145 m) due west of the Tri-State Rock. On the south side (New Jersey), it references the Tri-State Rock 72.25 feet (22.02 m) to the south.

The smaller monument, the Tri-States Monument, also known as the Tri-State Rock, marks both the northwest end of the New Jersey and New York boundary and the north end of the New Jersey and Pennsylvania boundary. It is a small granite block with inscribed lines marking the boundaries of the three states and a bronze United States Coast and Geodetic Survey marker. Both monuments were erected in 1882.

The city can be seen from nearby High Point, the highest point in the state of New Jersey.

== Transportation ==
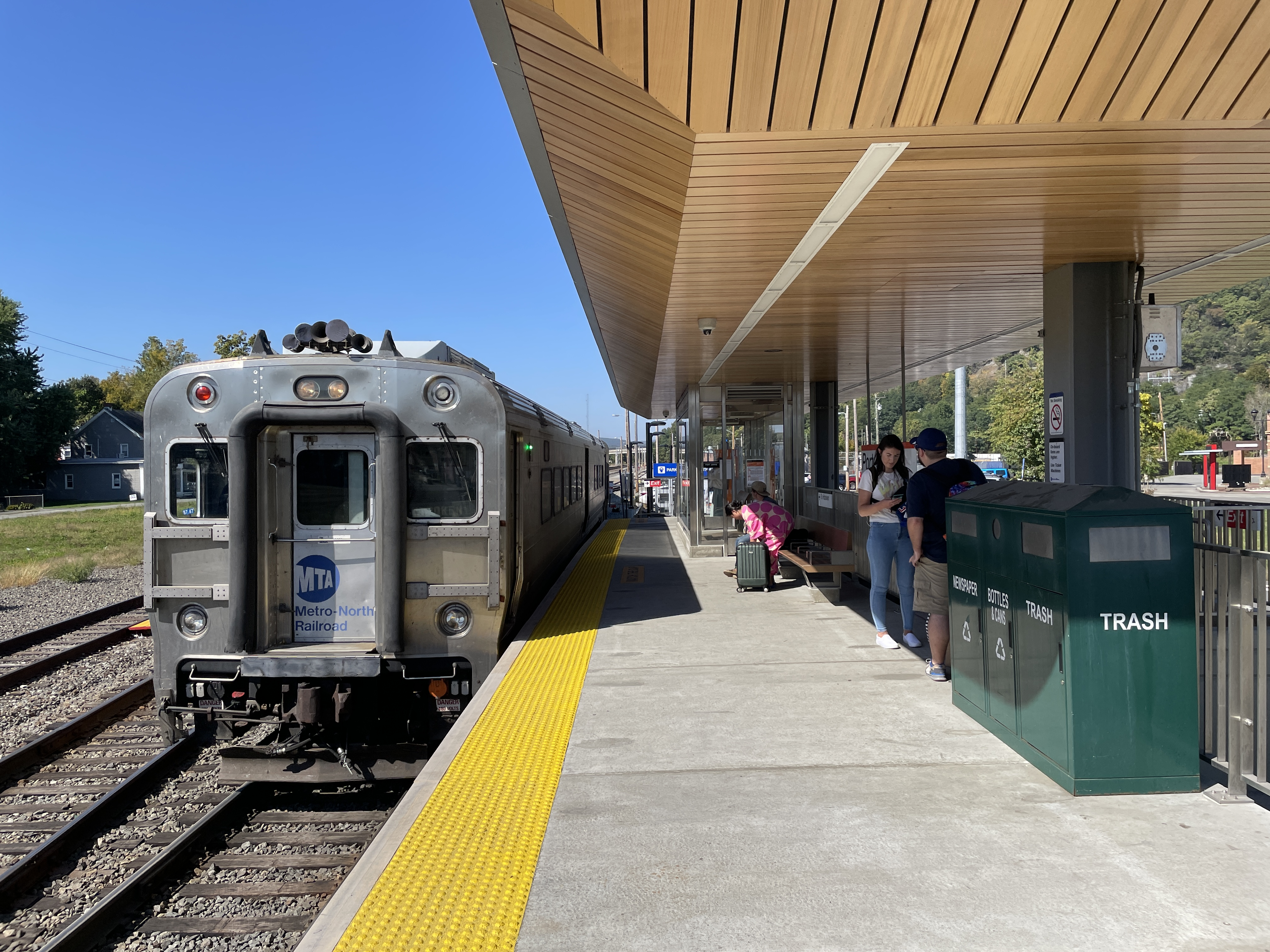
Port Jervis station, which serves as the terminus of Metro-North Railroad's Port Jervis Line

US 6, U.S. Route 209, New York State Route 42, and New York State Route 97 (the "Upper Delaware Scenic Byway") pass through Port Jervis. Interstate 84 passes to the south.

Port Jervis is the last stop on the 95-mile-long (153 km) Port Jervis Line, which is a commuter railroad service from Hoboken, New Jersey and New York City (via a Secaucus Transfer) that is contracted to NJ Transit by the Metro-North Railroad of the Metropolitan Transportation Authority. The track itself continues on to Binghamton and Buffalo, but passenger service west of Port Jervis was discontinued in November 1966.

Short Line provides bus service between Honesdale, Pennsylvania, Port Jervis, and the Port Authority Bus Terminal.

== Government ==
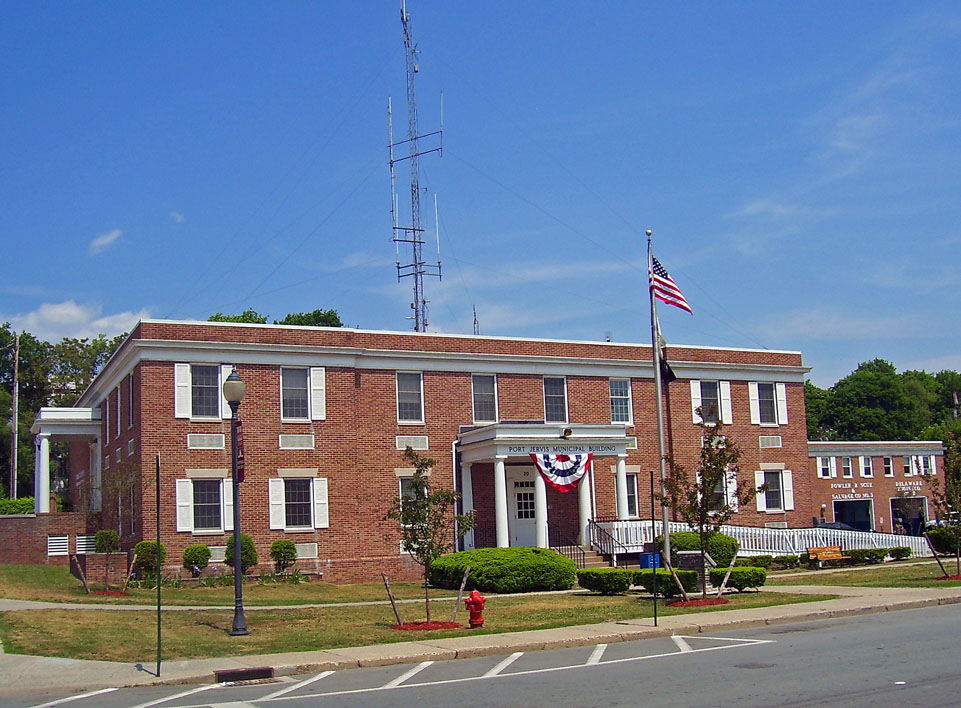
Port Jervis City Hall

Port Jervis is governed by a mayor and a city council under a mayor–council government system. The city council has nine members: a councilman-at-large and eight members elected from wards. The city comprises four wards, residents of which elect two council members each for two year terms. The mayor and councilman-at-large are elected at large for two year terms. Elections are held in odd number years. Terms of office begin on January 1.

Representation in the state legislature is split between Democrats and Republicans. The city is located in the 98th Assembly district, currently represented by Republican Karl Brabenec. Democrat James Skoufis represents the city in the state senate as part of the 42nd district.

Port Jervis is a part of New York's 18th congressional district, represented by Democrat Pat Ryan. Senators Charles Schumer and Kirsten Gillibrand represent all of New York in the U.S. Senate, including the city.

City council
Seat	Member	Party	Took office
Councilman-at-large	Michael Hockenberry	Republican	January 1, 2024
Councilman (ward 1)	Jason Vicchiariello	Republican	January 1, 2024
Councilman (ward 1)	Colin O'Connell	Republican	January 1, 2024
Councilman (ward 2)	Misty Fuller	Republican	January 1, 2022
Councilman (ward 2)	Maria Mann	Republican	January 1, 2018
Councilman (ward 3)	Jeffrey Rhoades	Republican	January 1, 2024
Councilman (ward 3)	Vacant		
Councilman (ward 4)	Jacqueline Dennison	Democratic	January 1, 2024
Councilman (ward 4)	Stanley Siegel	Democratic	January 1, 2024

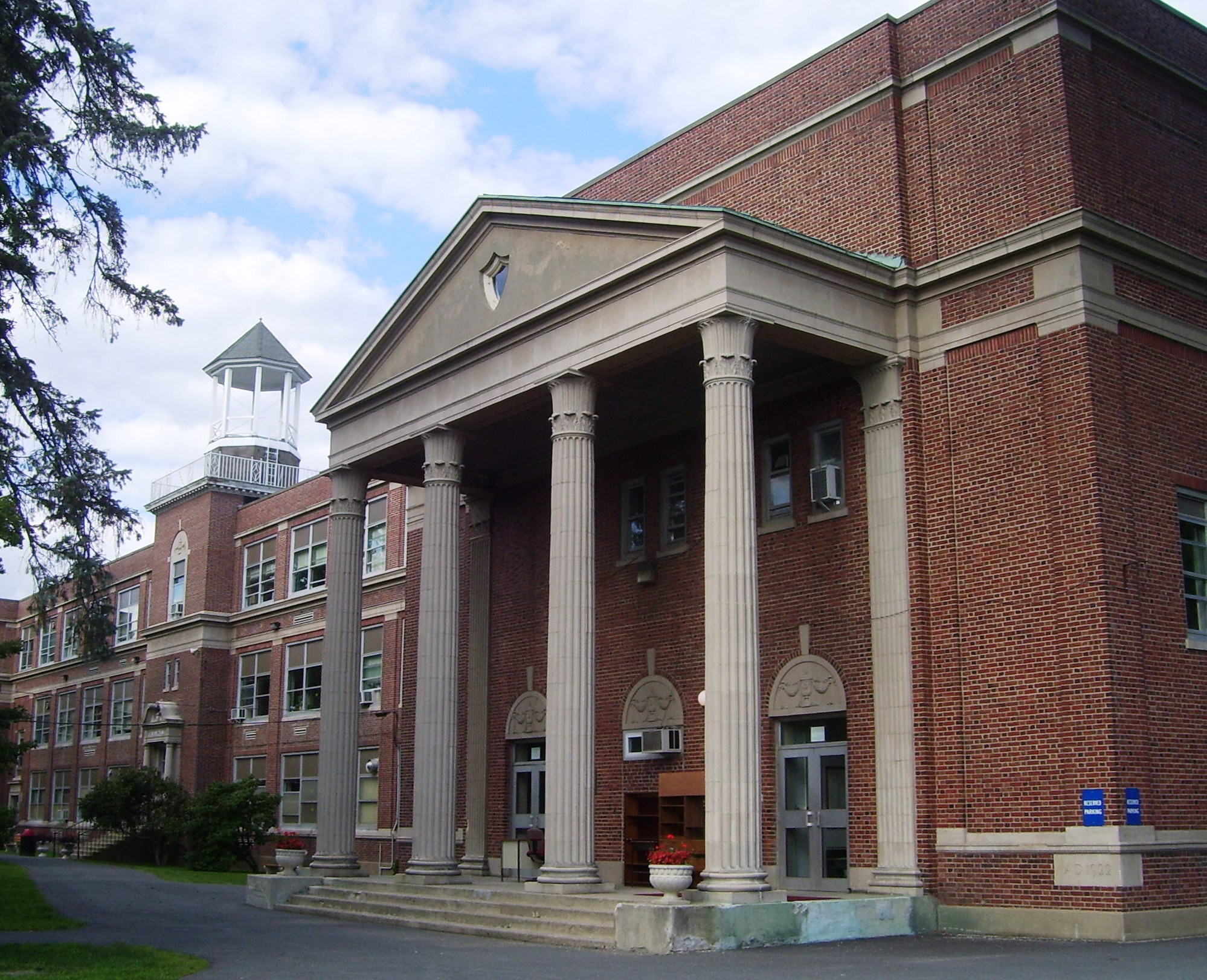
The at the time Port Jervis Middle School building (now used as East Main Elementary School), in the Port Jervis city limits

== Education ==
Port Jervis City School District operates public schools serving Port Jervis. The area elementary school, East Main Elementary School, is in Port Jervis city, in the former Port Jervis Middle School.

Port Jervis Middle School and Port Jervis High School share a property in Deerpark, with both having Port Jervis postal addresses. Formerly Anna S. Kuhl Elementary School was on the high school property.

Port Jervis has a school football rivalry with the City of Middletown.

== Recreation ==
The Port Jervis Recreation department maintains thirteen parks and squares. The city's largest parks are Elks-Brox Park and Riverside Park. Elks-Brox Park, which includes Skyline Drive, the Elks-Brox Campground and the overlook at Point Peter, backs up to the much larger Port Jervis Watershed Park and Recreation Area, which together include more than sixty miles of hiking and biking trails. Riverside Park is home to the Riverside Disc Golf Course, the Port Jervis Pump Track, trails, playground equipment, basketball courts, and other facilities. Riverside Park is also home to a summer concert series, as well as movies in the park. The smaller Farnum Park at the end of Ulster Place is also home to a summer concert series and a playground and a basketball court. Basketball Courts can also be found at Church Street Park and West End Beach. West End Beach is a park along the Delaware River that has a bathing beach in the summer, a boat launch, volleyball and basketball and also serves as the city's sledding hill in the winter. Playground equipment is also located at Barkley Street Park (Tri-States) and John Glenn Park on Cahoonzie Street. Other parks and squares in the city are Skinners Park, Orange Square/Veterans Memorial Park, Mothers Park, West End Memorial Park, Chris Marion Park, and Farmer's Market Square.

The Youth Community Center on Pike Street provides after-school activities throughout the year, as well as summer programming.

The Dog Yard, located near the Erie Turntable, is a free dog park open to residents by application.

The Lynx at River Bend Golf Club is located just past city limits on the other side of the Neversink River.

== Media ==
On July 4, 1953, WDLC at 1490 on the AM dial signed-on. Co-owned. The station also can receive WSPK-FM K104.7 and WRRV on 92.7.

== Notable people ==
Notable current and former residents of Port Jervis include:

- Frank Abbott, Mayor of Port Jervis from 1874 to 1876
- Ed and Lou Banach, University of Iowa wrestlers, NCAA All-Americans and NCAA Champions, 1984 Summer Olympics gold medalists in freestyle wrestling, lived in Port Jervis and graduated from Port Jervis Senior High School.
- William Stiles Bennet (1870–1962), U.S. representative for New York's 17th congressional district from 1905 to 1911 and New York's 23rd congressional district from 1915 to 1917.
- Daniel Cohen, children's book author
- Stephen Crane, author of The Red Badge of Courage, lived in Port Jervis between the ages 6–11 and frequently visited and wrote there from 1891 to early 1897.
- William Howe Crane (1854–1926), older brother of Stephen Crane, lived and practiced law in Port Jervis for many years.
- Stefanie Dolson, basketball player for the Washington Mystics and formerly of the Connecticut Huskies Women's Basketball team, was born in Port Jervis. She was a high school standout at nearby Minisink Valley High School, where she was a McDonald's All-American and won multiple National Championships with Connecticut.
- Samuel Fowler (1851–1919) represented New Jersey's 4th congressional district in the U.S. House of Representatives from 1893 to 1895.
- E. Arthur Gray (1925–2006) was the longest-serving mayor of Port Jervis and was later a New York State Senator. The Port Jervis United States Post Office building is dedicated in his name.
- Benjamin Hafner (March 24, 1821–spring 1899), known as "The Flying Dutchman" and "Uncle Ben", was an American locomotive engineer who worked for the Erie Railway.
- Albert Hammond Jr., (1980–), musician and music producer best known as a guitarist of The Strokes. His One Way Studio in the area is where much of the albums Angles and Comedown Machine were recorded, among others.
- Bucky Harris, Baseball player/manager and Hall of Famer; born in Port Jervis.
- The Kalin Twins, Hal (1934–2005) and Herbie (1934–2006), were one hit wonders whose record "When" made the top 5 in the U.S. and was number one for five weeks in the U.K. in 1958.
- Francis Marvin (1828–1905), U.S. representative for New York's 17th congressional district from 1893 to 1895.
- William C. Norris (1926–2024), a major general who served in the United States Air Force from 1945 to 1980.
- Amar'e Stoudemire (1982–), former professional basketball player for the New York Knicks. Lived in Port Jervis for a duration of grade school and middle school. It is said that this is where he played basketball at local parks and first fell in love with the sport of basketball.
- Hudson Van Etten, Medal of Honor recipient, was born in Port Jervis.

== Gallery ==
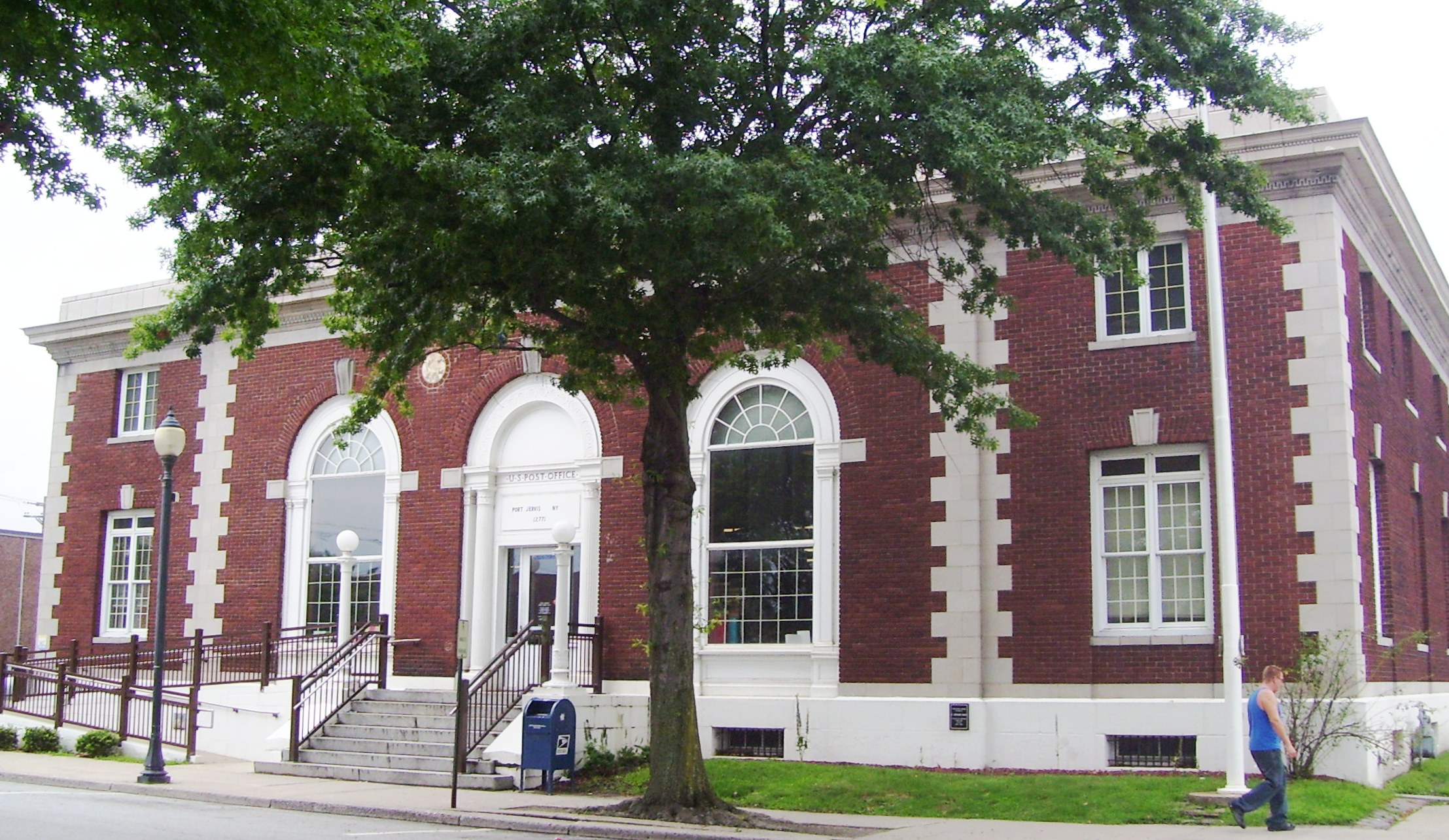
The E. Arthur Gray Post Office, on the NRHP

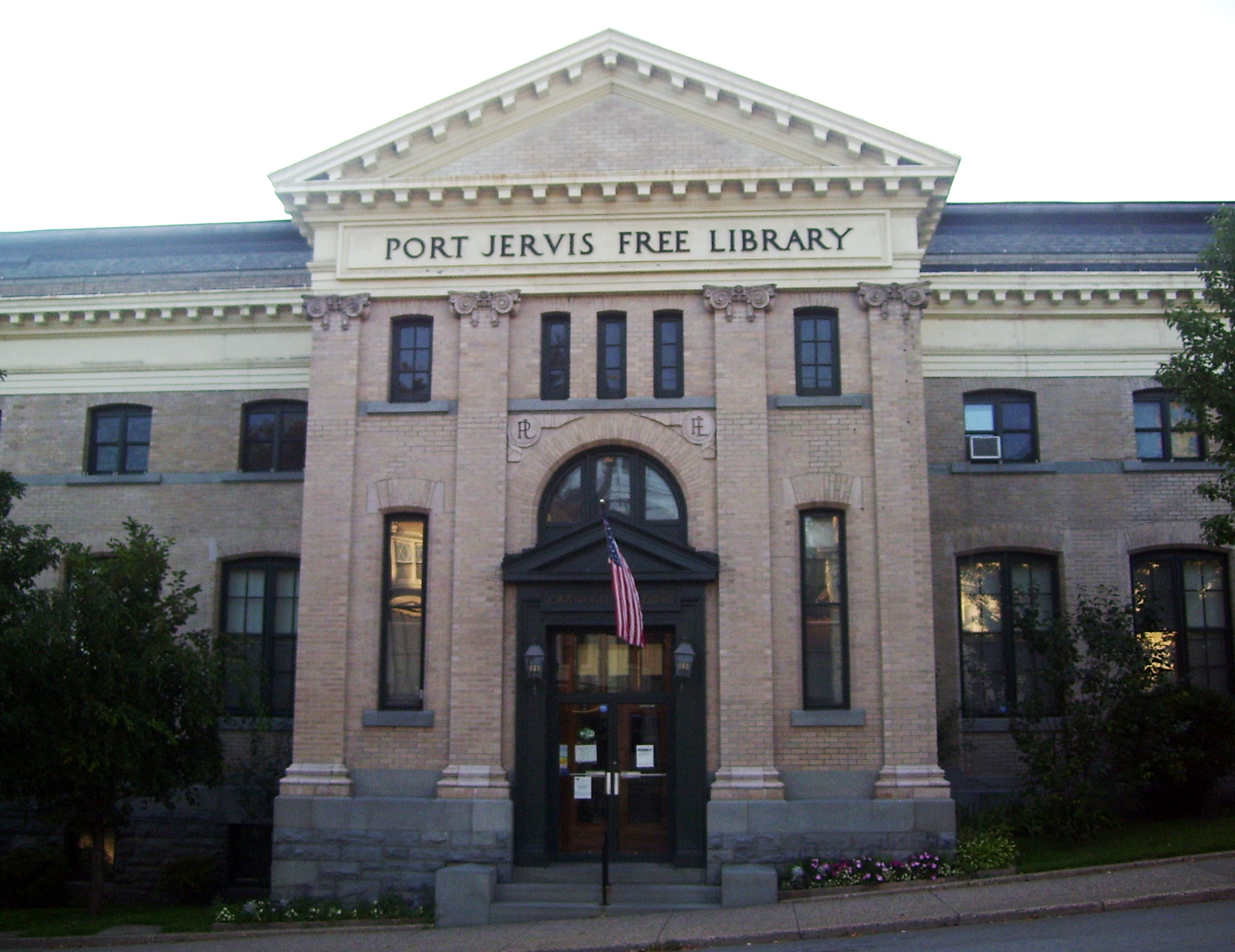
The Free Library, a Carnegie library built in 1903

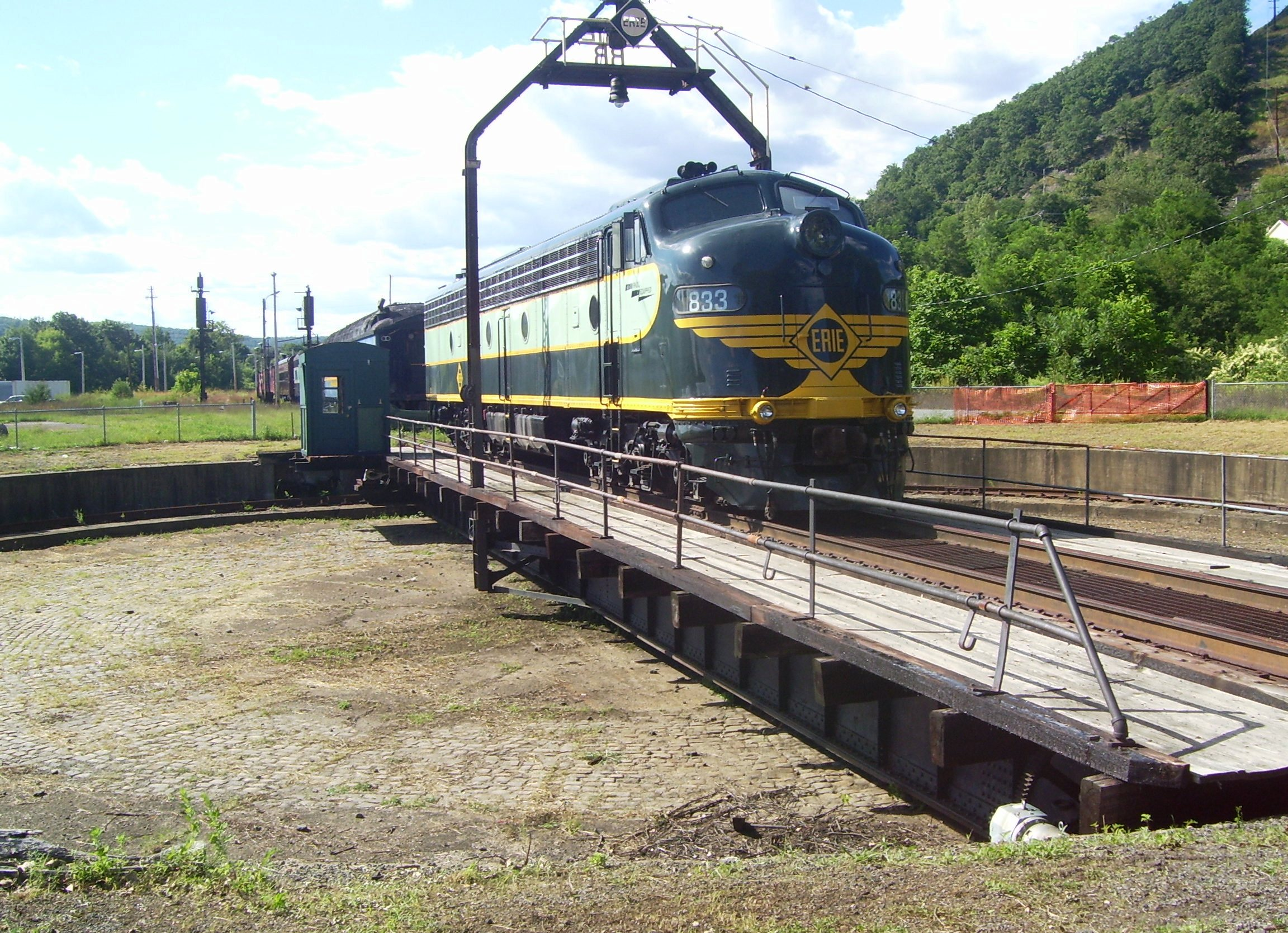
The largest working rail turntable in the U.S. is in Port Jervis

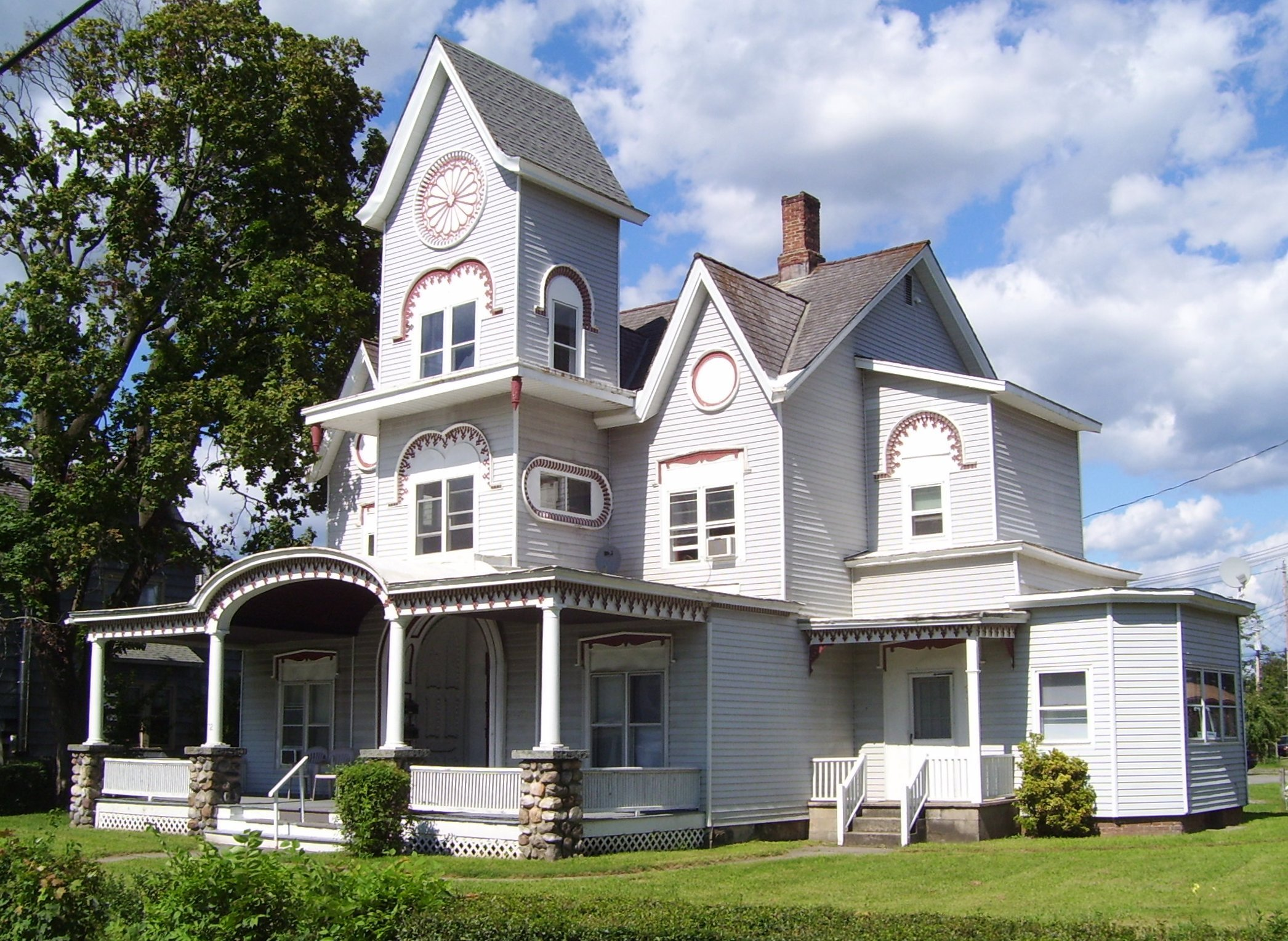
One of the many Victorian style houses in the city

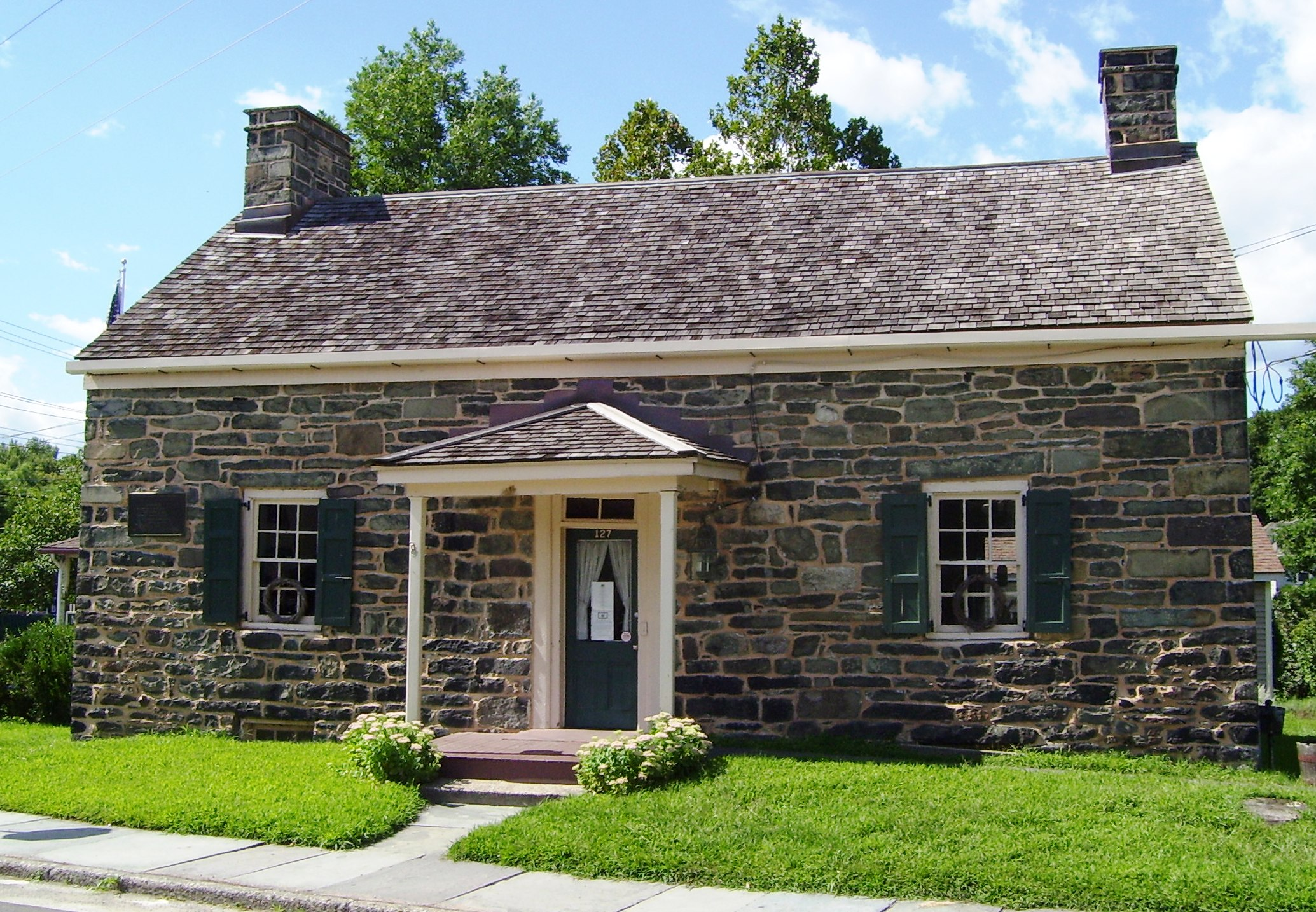
Fort Decker (1793), the oldest building in the city

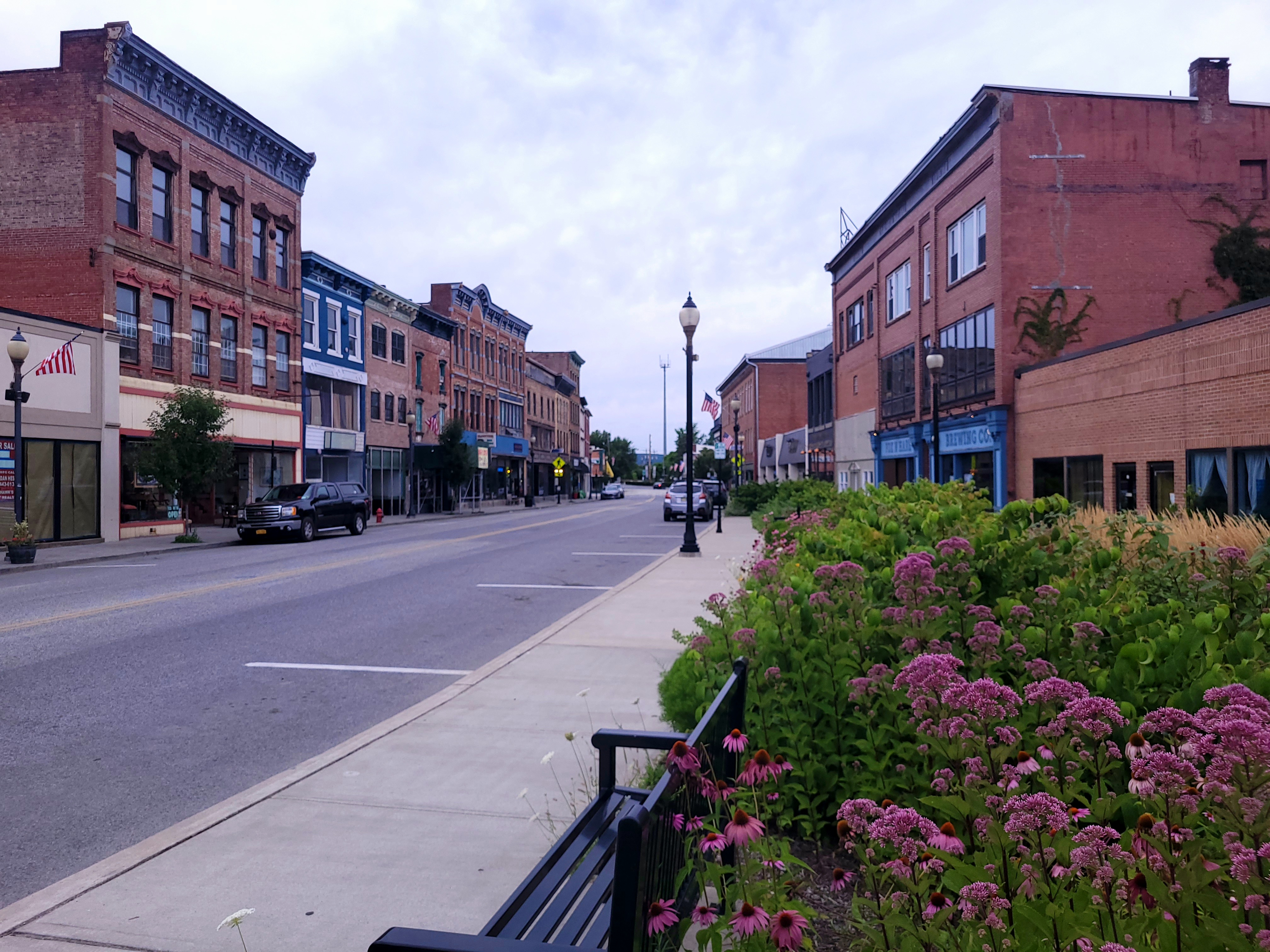
A view of many small businesses on Front St
