= Benjamin Hafner =

American locomotive engineer (1821–1899)

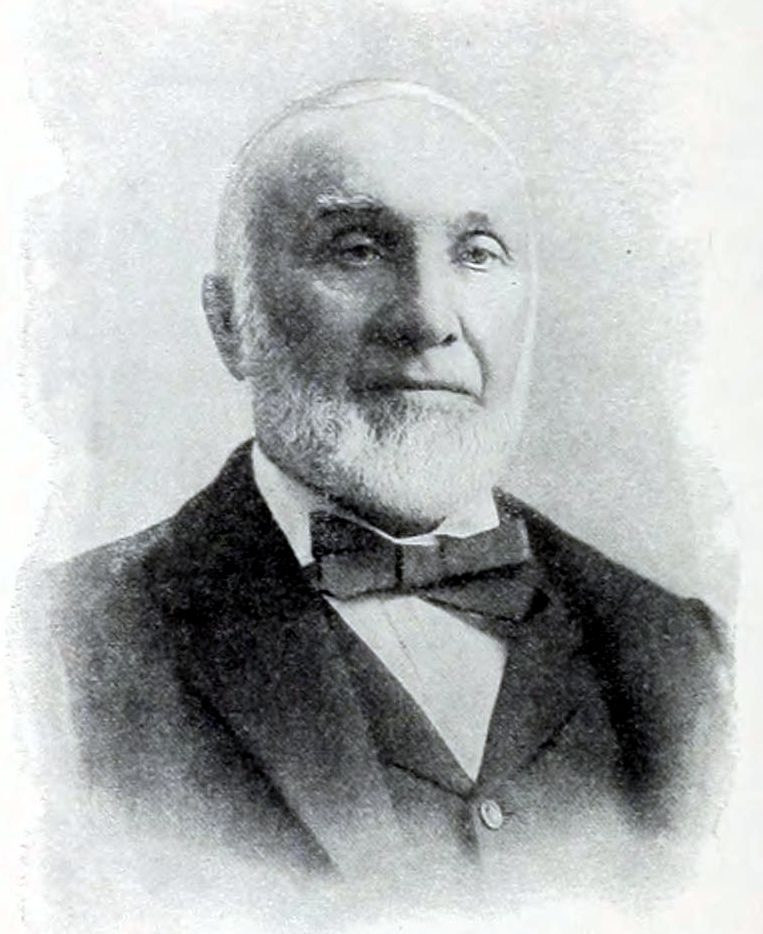
Benjamin Hafner of Port Jervis.

Benjamin Hafner (March 24, 1821 – 1899) known as "The Flying Dutchman" and "Uncle Ben", was an American locomotive engineer, who worked for the Erie Railway, and at the end of his life known as the oldest engineer in point of service in the United States.

== Biography ==
Benjamin Hafner, who departed this life in the spring of 1899, was at that time the oldest engineer – in point of service – in the United States. "Uncle Ben", as he was affectionately and familiarly known on the Erie, was born in Baden, Germany, on March 24, 1821, and came to the United States with his parents in 1832. His father was Valentine Hafner, one of Napoleon's soldiers, serving as a first lieutenant, and was in the march to Moscow.

Mr. Hafner began railroading as a fireman in 1839, and in 1840 commenced running as engineer on the old slab-rail road between Baltimore and Cumberland, Maryland. He came to the Erie in 1848, and was one of the pioneer engineers running between Piermont and Port Jervis. Later he ran on the Illinois Central, and in 1857 made a business trip to Europe. On his return he re-entered the employ of the Erie and continued in active service until March, 1892, when he quit running, and was given the position of depot master at Port Jervis, in which capacity he acted until his death.

He was married in February 14, 1858, to Miss Mary Catherine Goetz of Baltimore, and eleven children were born to them. Mr. Hafner was an honored member of the B. of L. E., and the Erie's officials.

== Work ==
=== Railroad engineer ===
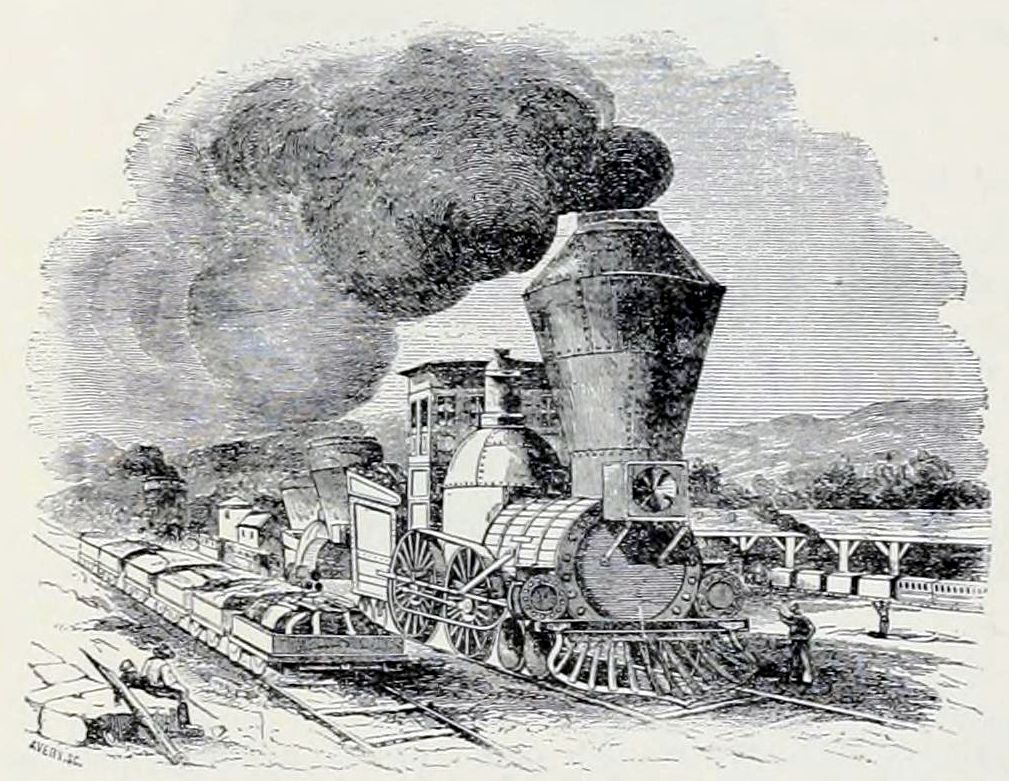
Erie Locomotive, type of 1846

Ben Hafner was an active locomotive engineer for fifty years, who completed his semi centennial as active engineer on August 17, 1890. In this period he wrecked several locomotives, and was himself buried under the locomotive five times. Hafner was a man of romance and of glamor, and known among railroad men in the country as the "Flying Dutchman.

He came as engineers on the Erie in 1848 while there was still no railroad beyond Port Jervis. Before he had served nine years on the Baltimore and Ohio. His first locomotive on the Erie was the "Susquehanna", a Rogers engine. There were then less than 200 men on the payroll of the company, and a majority of them were freight handlers at Piermont. Ben Hafner left the Erie in 1854, and ran on the Illinois Central Railroad, but returned to the Erie in 1858. He has been buried under his locomotive five times so that it took hours to dig him out, and he never got a scratch.

The Locomotive Engineers Journal (1875) published the following story about Hafner:

In the years 1843 and 1844 Mr. Hafner was running an engine from the Relay House to Harper's Ferry, and ran the trains that carried President Polk's message between those points, there being no telegraph in those days.
In the year 1845 he ran an engine from Washington to Baltimore, and witnessed the laying of the first telegraph wire. The wire was first put in the ground, in a trench about two feet in depth, but this plan did not work, as the wire was not properly insulated. The plan was then adopted of placing the wire on upright poles, (of about one-half the height of those now in use) which proved a business. He remembers well the excitement incident to the successful transmission of messages from Washington to Baltimore.
During his service of thirty-five years as engineer, one passenger only has been killed on his train. He ran one engine on this road thirteen years, and another six years, and has run miles enough to travel around the world over forty times...

Once, at Ramsey's, the train running at fifty miles an hour, he collided with a coal car. The train was behind time, and he had already made up forty minutes between Port Jervis and that place – a run of about fifty-five miles. His engine turned upside down, and some of the cars were wrecked. Mrs. James Gordon Bennett was a passenger on the train. A brakeman was badly hurt. Mrs. Bennett took up a collection for him among the passengers, contributing liberally herself.

=== The 1854 strike at Erie ===
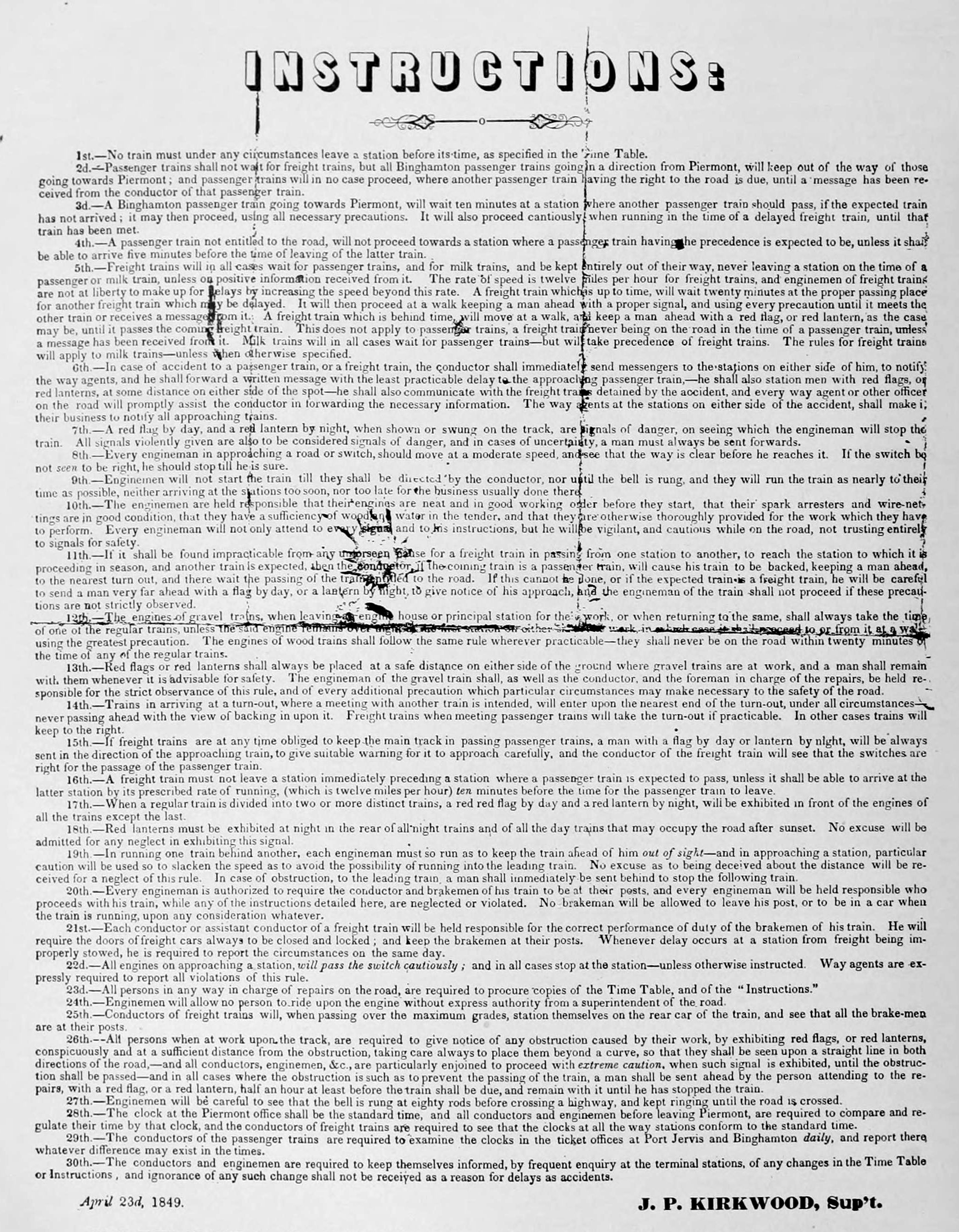
First code of the Erie Train Regulations from 1849 issued by James P. Kirkwood, which McCallum updated in 1854.

In a way Hafner triggered the 1854 strike at the Erie Railroad. It all started early in 1854, when Daniel McCallum then superintendent of the Susquehanna division, had drafted a renewed code of rules regulating the running of trains, which he submitted to the Directors of the company. They were pleased with it, and officially adopted it as supplementary to the existing rules. Charles Minot was then the general superintendent. The McCallum rules were adopted March 6, 1854, and Minot was directed to put them in force. He did not approve of some of them. He refused to promulgate the new code, and resigned.

McCallum took charge as general superintendent May 1, 1854, and his new rules were at once put in force. Trouble was not long in following. The engineers objected to the new order of things, particularly to Rule 6 of the McCallum code, which declared that every engineer would be held responsible for running off a switch at a station where he stopped, whether he should run off before or after receiving a signal to go forward from a switchman or any other person. The engineer, under this rule, was expected to see for himself whether the switch was right or not, and take no person's authority for the same at stations where trains stopped. The engineer, however, had a right to run past stations where he did not stop at a rate he was willing to hazard on his own account, the Company reserving the right to decide whether such running was reckless or not. " The road must be run safe first and fast afterward", the management declared.

The engineers also protested against the alleged "posting rule" of the company, under which notices of dismissal of engineers was at once posted with other railroad companies to the injury of the men. An abrogation of the distasteful rules was requested, June 15, by a committee, consisting of John Donohue, William Schrier, and John C. Meginnes. Superintendent McCallum's explanation and reply not being satisfactory, the engineers struck on June 17 – the first strike in the history of the railroad. This strike on the Erie was settled after ten days' paralysis of the business of the railroad, and a loss of many thousands of dollars to the company.

The engineer over whose case the strike resulted was Benjamin Hafner of the Eastern Division. On the evening of June 10 ran off a switch at Turner's. He was dismissed. After he was dismissed Hafner was sent for by Superintendent McCallum to talk about the incident. Hafner refused to go unless he was reinstated first. McCallum declined to reinstate him without a consultation. The matter was taken up by all the leading engineers on the Delaware and Eastern divisions, with the above result.

=== The "Flying Dutchman" ===
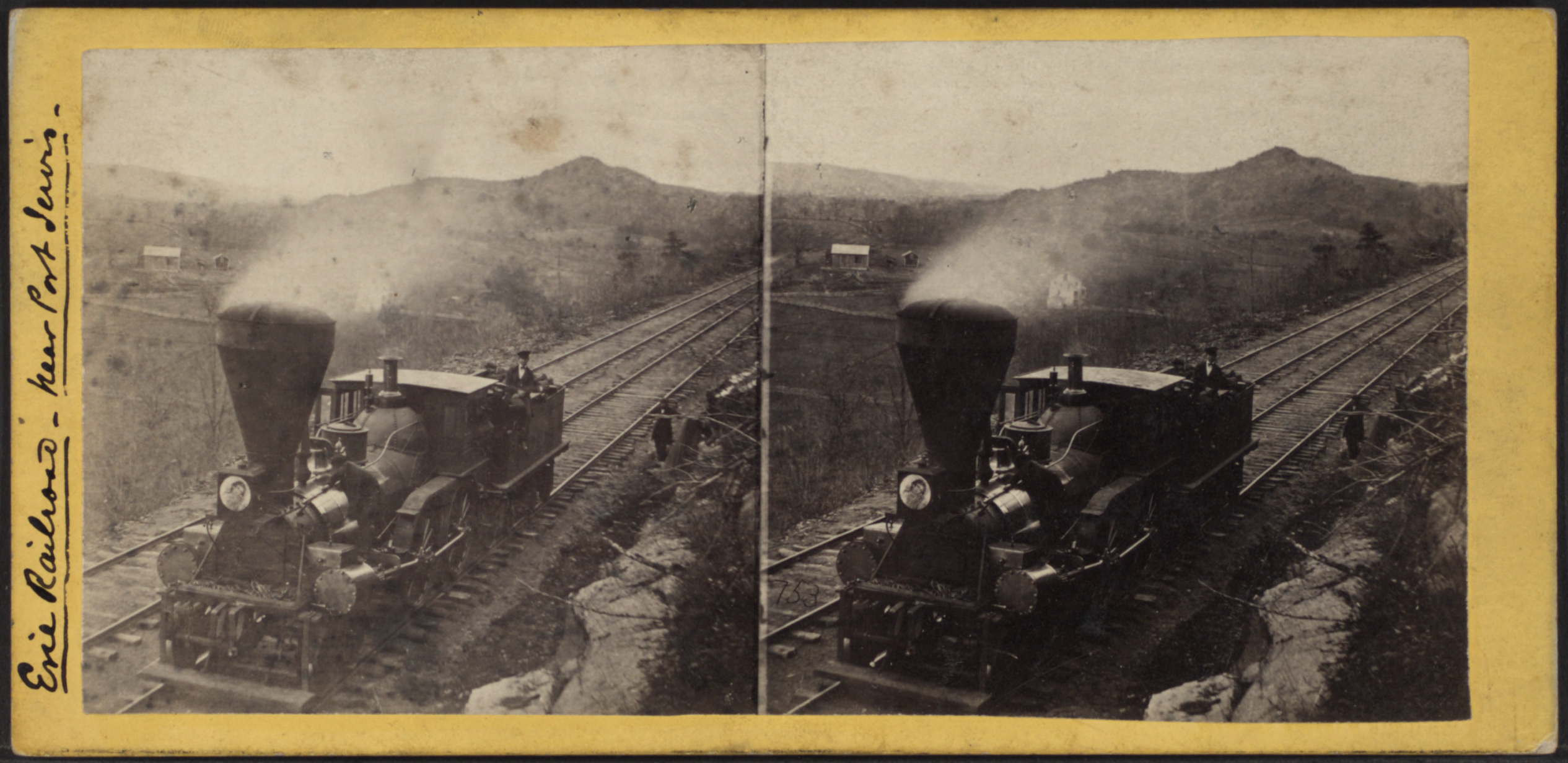
Erie Railroad near Port Jervis, around 1860–75.

In 1869, while Jay Gould was President of the Erie, he ordered a locomotive made at the Brooks Locomotive Works at Dunkirk, which he named the George G. Barnard, after the famous Judge of that name. It was the handsomest locomotive ever made up to that time. It was decorated by paintings in oil, on every spot where one could be placed, by the late Jasper F. Crapsey, the artist. There were fourteen coats of varnish on the boiler. Gould selected Ben Hafner to be the engineer of the locomotive. The first trip Jay Gould ever took behind this locomotive with Ben at the throttle he was in a special car, bound for Susquehanna, 104 miles from Port Jem's. Gould told Hafner to go pretty fast. He went so fast that before they had gone many miles over the crooked Delaware Division Gould sent his colored porter ahead to tell Ben to go slower, much to the disgust of Ben.

Ben Hafner got the name of the "Flying Dutchman" in this way: One day in the summer of 1871 No. 8 was late when he took that train at Port Jervis. He had orders to make the run to Jersey City in as short a time as he could. The distance was eighty-nine miles. Hafner made the run in just two hours, including seven stops, one of which was fourteen minutes at Turner's for supper. The passengers were badly frightened at the speed of the train. When the train reached Jersey, one of the passengers passed Ben as he was leaning out of his cab, and yelled at him:

"Say, I'd rather sail in the 'Flying Dutchman' than ride after you!"

From that day to this Ben Hafner has been the "Flying Dutchman" to all railroad men. In 1893 Hafner retired as an engineer after more than half a century on a locomotive, and since then has been depot master at Port Jervis. He was hale and hearty at seventy-six.
