= The Monster (novella) =

1898 novella by Stephen Crane

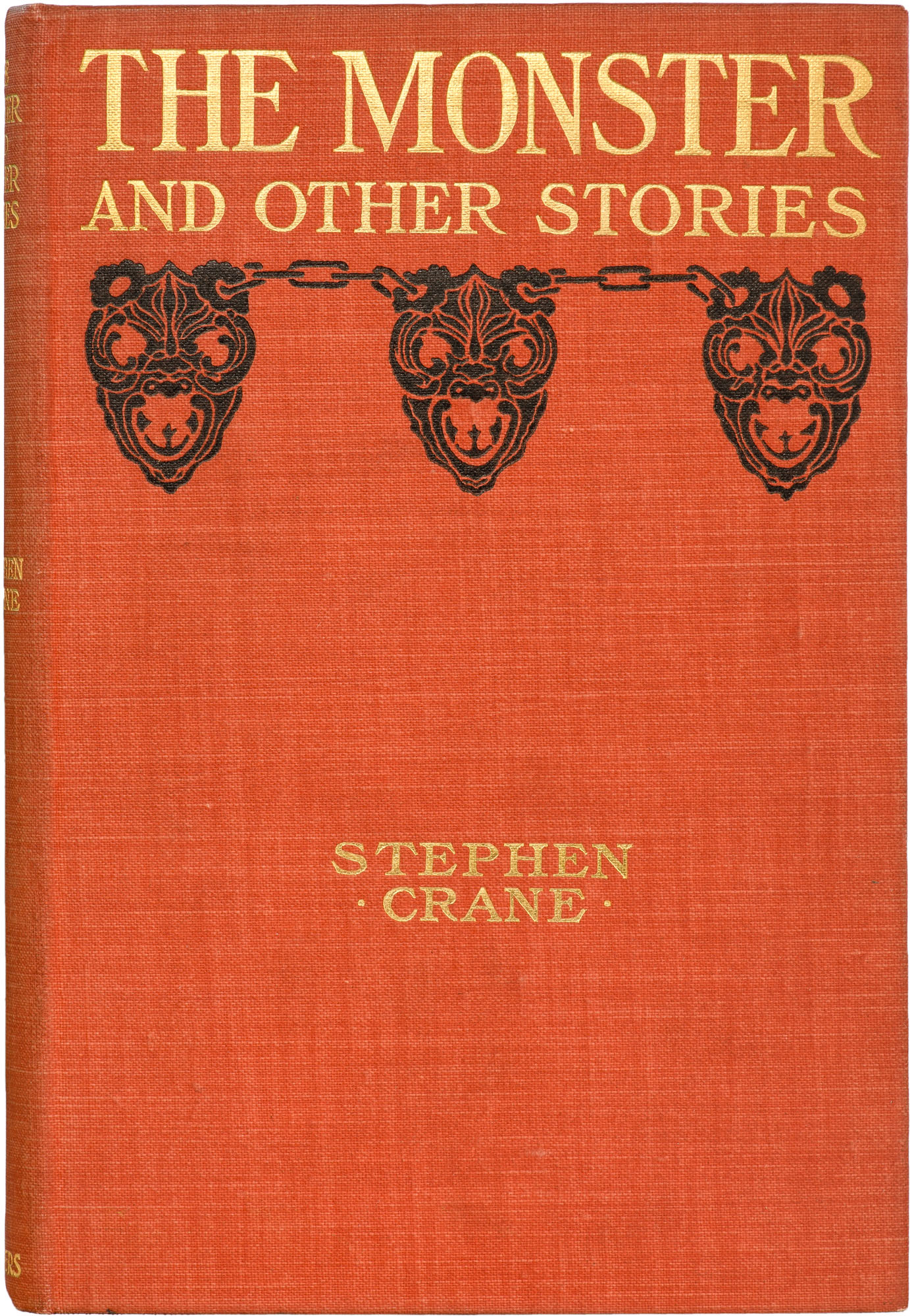
First edition of The Monster and Other Stories, published in 1899

The Monster is an 1898 novella by American author Stephen Crane (1871–1900). The story takes place in the small, fictional town of Whilomville, New York. An African-American coachman named Henry Johnson, who is employed by the town's physician, Dr. Trescott, becomes horribly disfigured after he saves Trescott's son from a fire. When Henry is branded a "monster" by the town's residents, Trescott vows to shelter and care for him, resulting in his family's exclusion from the community. The novella reflects upon the 19th-century social divide and ethnic tensions in America.

The fictional town of Whilomville, which is used in 14 other Crane stories, was based on Port Jervis, New York, where Crane lived with his family for a few years during his youth. It is thought that he took inspiration from several local men who were similarly disfigured, although modern critics have made numerous connections between the story and the 1892 lynching in Port Jervis of an African-American man named Robert Lewis. A study of prejudice, fear, and isolation in a rather small town, the novella was first published in Harper's Magazine in August 1898. A year later, it was included in The Monster and Other Stories—the last collection of Crane's work to be published during his lifetime.

Written in a more exact and less dramatic style than two of his previous major works (Maggie: A Girl of the Streets and The Red Badge of Courage), The Monster differs from the other Whilomville stories in its scope and length. Its themes include the paradoxical study of monstrosity and deformity, as well as race and tolerance. While the novella and collection received mixed reviews from contemporary critics, The Monster is now considered one of Crane's best works.

== Background and writing ==
Crane began writing The Monster in June 1897 while living in Oxted, England with his longtime partner Cora Taylor. Despite his previous success—The Red Badge of Courage had gone through 14 printings in the United States and six in England—Crane was running out of money. To survive financially, he worked at a feverish pitch, writing prolifically for both the English and the American markets. He later remarked that he wrote The Monster "under the spur of great need", as he desperately required funds. In August of that year, Crane and Cora were injured in a carriage accident while visiting friend Harold Frederic and his mistress Kate Lyon in Homefield, Kenley; after a week of recuperation, they followed the couple on vacation to Ireland, where Crane finished the story.

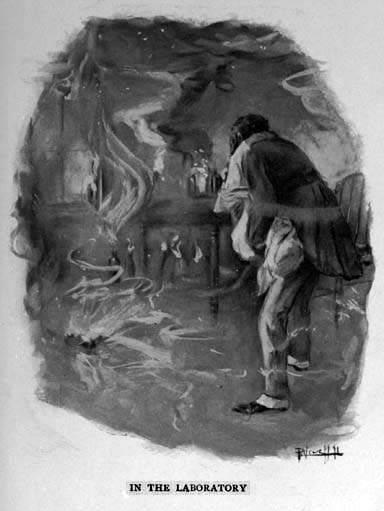
Illustration of Henry Johnson carrying Jimmie through the burning house, by Peter Newell

The Monster was Crane's first story to feature the fictional town of Whilomville; it would eventually serve as the setting of 14 stories, 13 of which would appear in the 1900 anthology Whilomville Stories. The town was based on Port Jervis, New York, where the author lived from the age of six to eleven. Although Crane and his mother relocated to Asbury Park, New Jersey in 1880, until 1896 he frequently stayed with his older brother and Port Jervis resident William Howe Crane. Crane admitted to his publishers that while he readily used Port Jervis as inspiration while writing The Monster, he was anxious to ensure that the residents of his previous hometown did not recognize themselves in the fictional Whilomville. While Crane biographer Thomas Beer claimed to trace the prototype of Henry Johnson to a Port Jervis teamster named Levi Hume, Crane's niece, Edna Crane Sidbury, believed the character and his disfigurement were influenced by a local waste collector whose face was damaged by cancer. In Black Frankenstein: The Making of an American Metaphor, author Elizabeth Young theorized that Crane may also have been inspired by popular freak show attractions such as Zip the Pinhead, whose real name was William Henry Johnson, and Joseph Merrick, the Elephant Man. It is also possible that Crane found thematic inspiration in Henrik Ibsen's An Enemy of the People; although first published in 1882, the play—about a physician who finds himself ostracized by his community—first became popular in the United States in the mid-1890s.

Modern critics have connected the novella's themes of racial division to a violent episode in Port Jervis' history. On June 2, 1892, an African-American man named Robert Lewis was lynched for allegedly assaulting a local white woman. On his way to the Port Jervis jail, Lewis was set upon by a mob of several hundred white men who dragged him through the town, beat him and hanged him from a tree. William Howe Crane lived within sight of where the lynching took place and was one of the few men, together with the chief of police, who attempted to intervene. Although Stephen Crane was not present, there were detailed accounts published in both the Port Jervis Gazette and the New-York Tribune, and Crane contributed to the Tribune at the time. The Gazette marked the day of Lewis' lynching as "one of the most disgraceful scenes that was ever enacted in Port Jervis", and activist Ida B. Wells launched a campaign to investigate the murder as well as the widespread theory that Lewis was set up. Of the 1,134 reported lynchings throughout the United States between 1882 and 1899, Lewis was the only black man to be lynched in New York.

Crane initially sent his manuscript of more than 21,000 words to McClure's, along with several other works including "The Bride Comes to Yellow Sky", but it remained unpublished for nearly a year. After McClure's eventual rejection, The Monster appeared in the August 1898 issue of Harper's Magazine with illustrations by Peter Newell. A year later, it was published in the United States by Harper & Brothers Publishers in a collection titled The Monster and Other Stories, which included two other works by Crane, "The Blue Hotel" and "His New Mittens". The first British edition, which added an additional four stories, was published in 1901.

== Plot summary ==
After being admonished by his father, Dr. Ned Trescott, for damaging a peony while playing in his family's yard, young Jimmie Trescott visits his family's coachman, Henry Johnson. Henry, who is described as "a very handsome negro", "known to be a light, a weight, and an eminence in the suburb of the town", is friendly toward Jimmie. Later that evening Henry dresses smartly and saunters through town—inciting catcalls from friends and ridicule from the local white men—on his way to call on the young Bella Farragut, who is extremely taken with him.

That same evening, a large crowd gathers in the park to hear a band play. Suddenly, the nearby factory whistle blows to alert the townspeople of a fire in the second district of the town; men gather hose-carts and head toward the blaze that is quickly spreading throughout Dr. Trescott's house. Mrs. Trescott is saved by a neighbor, but cannot locate Jimmie, who is trapped inside. Henry appears from the crowd and rushes into the house in search of the boy, finding him unharmed in his bedroom. Unable to retreat the way he came, Henry carries Jimmie, wrapped in a blanket, to the doctor's laboratory and the hidden stairway that leads outside. He discovers the fire has blocked this way out as well and collapses beside Dr. Trescott's desk. A row of nearby jars shatters from the heat, spilling molten chemicals upon Henry's upturned face.

The child would possibly be scarred badly, but his life was undoubtedly safe. As for the negro Henry Johnson, he could not live. His body was frightfully seared, but more than that, he now had no face. His face had simply been burned away.

— Stephen Crane, The Monster

Dr. Trescott returns home to find his house ablaze; after he is told by his hysterical wife that Jimmie is still inside, he rushes into the house by way of the laboratory's hidden passageway. He finds Jimmie still wrapped in the blanket and carries him outside. Hearing that Henry is inside the house, Dr. Trescott attempts to re-enter, but is held back. Another man goes into the house and returns with the badly burned "thing" that used to be Henry Johnson. The injured men and boy are taken to Judge Denning Hagenthorpe's house across the street to be treated, but while it is thought that Dr. Trescott and Jimmie will survive their injuries, Henry is pronounced as good as dead; he is mourned as a hero by the town.

Henry Johnson survives, however, under the watchful eye of Dr. Trescott, who treats the injured man out of gratitude for saving his son's life. Hagenthorpe, a leading figure in town, urges Trescott to let Henry die, stating that he "will hereafter be a monster, a perfect monster, and probably with an affected brain. No man can observe you as I have observed you and not know that it was a matter of conscience with you, but I am afraid, my friend, that it is one of the blunders of virtue." Ultimately Trescott decides to move Henry, who has sustained disfiguring injuries to his face and psyche, to a local Black household, but Henry's presence proves troubling for the family's well-being, and he is moved to another. One night Henry absconds, visiting various people around town and leaving terrified neighbors in his wake, including Bella Farragut, who he attempts to court as if no time has passed since they last met. Not welcome anywhere else, Henry is eventually moved to the carriage-house in the newly built Trescott home. Despite Dr. Trescott's protection, Henry is branded a monster by the townspeople, who avoid the Trescotts as a result. Although previously friendly to Henry, Jimmie now mocks him, daring his friends to approach the disfigured man. Once the leading doctor in Whilomville, Trescott's reputation suffers greatly, as does that of his wife, who no longer receives visitors.

== Style ==
After a moment the window brightened as if the four panes of it had been stained with blood, and a quick ear might have been led to imagine the fire-imps calling and calling, clan joining clan, gathering to the colors. From the street, however, the house maintained its dark quiet, insisting to a passer-by that it was the safe dwelling of people who chose to retire early to tranquil dreams. No one could have heard this low droning of the gathering clans.

— Stephen Crane, The Monster

The story is told from the point of view of a selectively omniscient narrator who seemingly chooses whether or not to divulge plot points as they occur, causing "a pattern of expectation" on the part of the reader. Although the novella is separated into 24 chapters, some critics—among them Charles B. Ives, Thomas Gullason and Marston LeFrance—believe these chapters are further divided into two parts: chapters 1–9 lead up to Henry's injury, whereas chapters 10–24 map the town's response. Critic David Halliburton wrote in his 1989 book The Color of the Sky: A Study of Stephen Crane that The Monster displayed a more "chastened" and exact style than Crane's earlier works, which were often a mixture of clever bawdiness and epic dramatics—both of which are seen respectively in Maggie: A Girl of the Streets and The Red Badge of Courage.

Edwin H. Cady believed The Monster is the best indication of the writer Crane may have become had he lived longer, showcasing a style that is "technically proficient, controlled, and broadly insightful." The Monster relies heavily on Crane's signature use of imagery and symbolism. Frequent images and metaphors dealing with sight appear several times in the story, especially in regard to the townspeople's lack of vision, both literally and morally. The townspeople are similarly depicted using imagery of either animals or machines, characterizing them as both bestial and mindless. Color imagery is also prevalent. For example, fire—both literal and symbolic—features prominently throughout the story. While critics as early as Edward Garnett in 1921 pointed to Crane's heavy use of irony in The Monster, other critics such as Michael D. Warner question whether Crane intended the story to be read as ironic, or if this is the result of the author's "oddly contradictory attitude toward his characters."

In his introduction to 1921's Men, Women and Boats, one of the first Crane anthologies, Vincent Starrett noted the difference in tone between The Monster and the 14 other tales that Crane set in the fictional Whilomville. He wrote, "The realism is painful; one blushes for mankind. But while this story really belongs in the volume called Whilomville Stories, it is properly left out of that series. The Whilomville stories are pure comedy, and The Monster is a hideous tragedy." Critic William M. Morgan noted the stories' similar fascination with "pure animal spirits" and "meanings of boyhood", but differentiated The Monster's focus on "a larger, more mature, and modernizing community." Paul Sorrentino also pointed to the style differences, noting the story's focus on the adult characters rather than the children, as well as the overall length of the story; at more than 21,000 words, it dwarfs the other Whilomville tales. However, there is disagreement among critics as to whether The Monster should be considered a short story or a novella. Crane called it a "novelette", and the Library of America edition refers to it as a novella.

== Themes ==
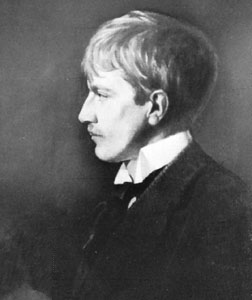
Stephen Crane in 1894; print of a portrait by artist and friend Corwin K. Linson

The question of morality plays a large role in The Monster, especially in terms of compassion and tolerance. Several critics have pointed to the novella's non-absolute stance on these themes, mainly in regard to Dr. Trescott's ethical dilemma in his devotion to Henry, a black man and his son's savior. As author Patrick Dooley points out, "What is at stake in The Monster is that if Trescott is a moral man, Crane has rejected common-sense morality. If Trescott's actions are supererogative and saintly, however, he is to be applauded and admired, but the ordinary moral behavior of average people and the competence of everyday heroes will not have been expunged." Crane scholar Stanley Wertheim also noted the duplicitous morality depicted by the town of Whilomville, which exhibits "prejudice, fear and isolation in an environment traditionally associated with neighborliness and goodwill."

Various critics have written about the story's paradoxical themes of deformity and monstrosity. Not only does Henry Johnson suffer a literal and physical defacement that brands him a monster, but the Trescotts suffer metaphorical loss of face when they are cast out by society. The trope of monstrosity takes on a second meaning when it becomes clear that the townspeople's actions make them more monstrous than the man they shun for his deformity; as professor and critic Lee Clark Mitchell asked in his essay "Face, Race, and Disfiguration in Stephen Crane's 'The Monster'", "Is 'the monster' the disfigured black man or is it the town that comes to dis-figure him?" Similarly, Harold Bloom called The Monster an example of the "invasion myth", made worse by the fact that the "monster" is born from within the townspeople's collective mind. Henry-the-monster is therefore "generated by its fears of social instability, its prejudices about appearance (including racism), and its all-consuming passion for gossip and drama." Trescott, the only man in town not to see Henry as an invader, also becomes ostracized by the frenzied small-town mentality.

Race is a polarizing theme throughout the story. As William M. Morgan wrote, while the white characters are largely depicted as cold and humorless, and the black characters as warm and amusing, the town's racial hierarchy is omnipresent. Slavery is referred to several times throughout the story, as critic Nan Goodman noted; as a post-Civil War work, The Monster revisits slavery's legacy, as well as its effects on modern African Americans like Henry Johnson. At the beginning of the story, it is made clear that the white townspeople tolerate Henry because he "behaves himself" and "knows his place" as a black man. Later, when Henry struggles through the burning house to save Jimmie, it is said that "he was submitting, submitting because of his fathers, bending his mind in a most perfect slavery to this conflagration." However, while his suffering is central to the story, Henry Johnson is never really fleshed out as a character; before the fire, he "strikes in quick succession the minstrel's poses of an old-time, happy-go-lucky Negro", who charms children and women alike. Despite his heroism, Morgan stated, Henry does not stray far from a racial stereotype. Critics such as Lillian Gilkes and John R. Cooley have noted Crane's lack of racial sensitivity while writing The Monster, although they argue that the author was simply exhibiting "unconscious racism" in order to fulfill literary conventions of the late 19th century. In his 2002 essay, "Blunders of Virtue: The Problem of Race in Stephen Crane's ‘The Monster’", John Clemen identifies and attacks critics' tendency either "to ignore the evidence of Crane's racism, to dismiss it as a cultural influence irrelevant to his larger purposes, or to reconfigure it within his irony in such a way as to enable the story and its author to achieve an unintended racial insight."

== Reception and legacy ==
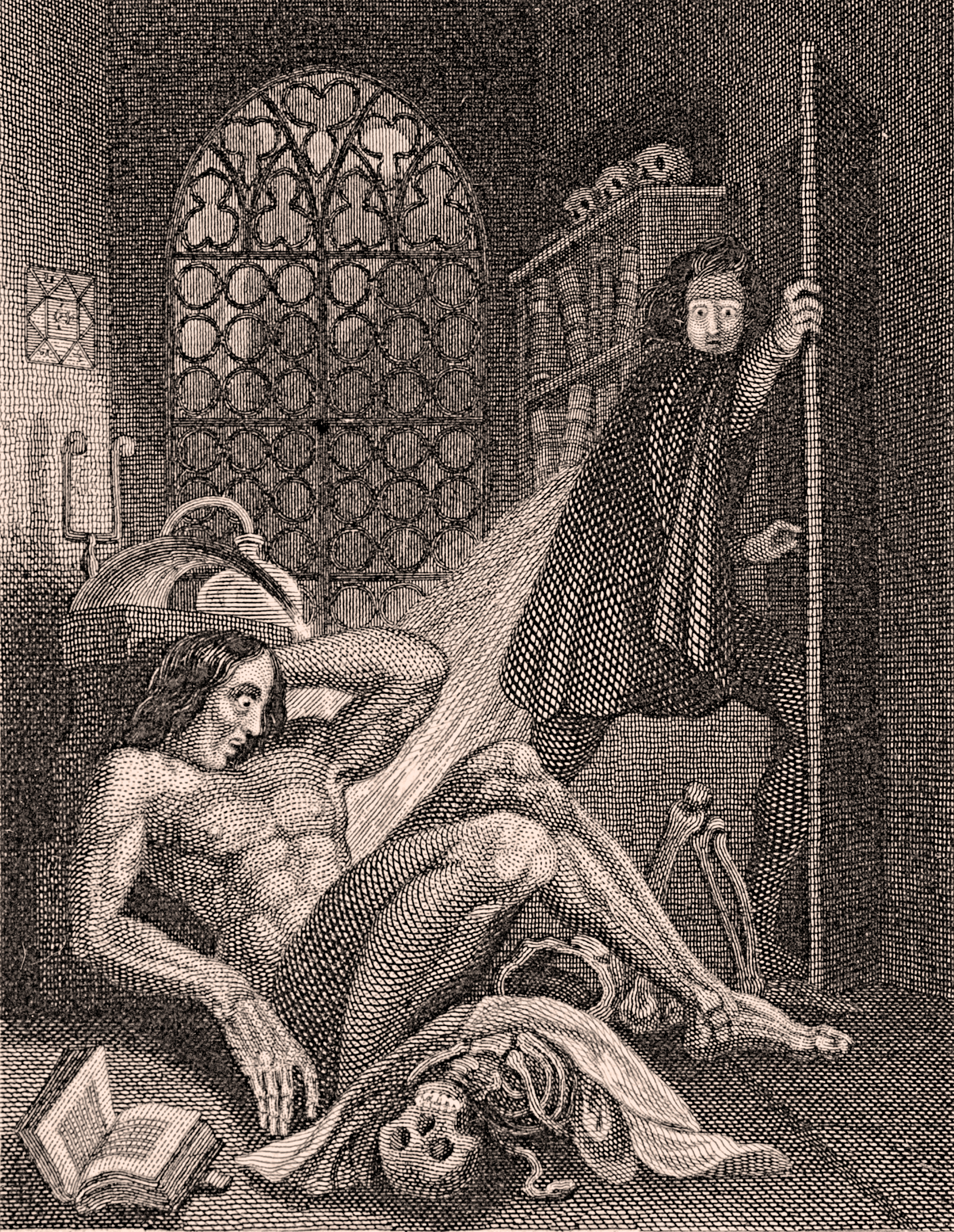
The Monster is sometimes compared to Mary Shelley's Frankenstein (1818).

The Monster received mixed to positive reviews from contemporary critics. Before its publication, Crane's friend Joseph Conrad wrote while responding to a partial draft: "the damned story has been haunting me ... I think it must be fine." William Dean Howells, an early champion of Crane, proclaimed the novella to be "the greatest short story ever written by an American". The Spectator concluded that The Monster alone would have cemented Crane's literary reputation; its reviewer wrote, "If Mr. Crane had never written anything else, he would have earned the right of remembrance by this story alone."

The reviewer for The Critic dismissed it as "an unpleasant story ... There is humor in the telling, but it is humor of a rather grim character." Julian Hawthorne, son of author Nathaniel Hawthorne, also ultimately disliked the novella, calling it "an outrage on art and humanity". He did, however, point to the similarities between Crane's "monster" and Victor Frankenstein's creation in Mary Shelley's most famous work, stating that Crane, like Shelley before him, successfully depicted an innocent outsider being tormented by townspeople who are themselves made monstrous by their irrational fears. Other critics have since echoed the comparison between Shelley's character and Henry Johnson; Elizabeth Young explained the parallels in that, similar to Frankenstein's narrative—in which "a male body is hideously transformed in a scientist's laboratory and brought back by the scientist from the dead"—Johnson's disfigurement takes place in a doctor's laboratory, and it is Trescott that ultimately saves him.

The Monster and Other Stories was the last collection of Crane's work to be published during his lifetime. In the mid-20th century, the novella received a resurgence of critical attention, especially in regard to studies of race relations in late 19th-century New York. Critic Chester L. Wolford wrote that the story "reveals truths not socially accepted for almost another hundred years. The story is, indeed, an excoriation of social conditions for the blacks, but more important ... it is an excoriation of all communities, all societies, in all places and all times." African-American author Ralph Ellison called The Monster, alongside Mark Twain's Adventures of Huckleberry Finn, "one of the parents of the modern American novel". In a 1999 article, critic James Nagel stated that "no other work of short fiction in the decade was more important thematically, and nothing until William Faulkner's 'The Bear' so enriched the genre in the United States". Screenwriter and director Albert Band adapted Crane's novella for the 1959 film Face of Fire, starring Cameron Mitchell as Dr. Trescott and James Whitmore as Johnson. Unlike in the original story, Johnson was depicted as white, and his first name was changed from Henry to Monk.
