= Lynching of Robert Lewis =

1892 lynching in New York, US

Robert Lewis
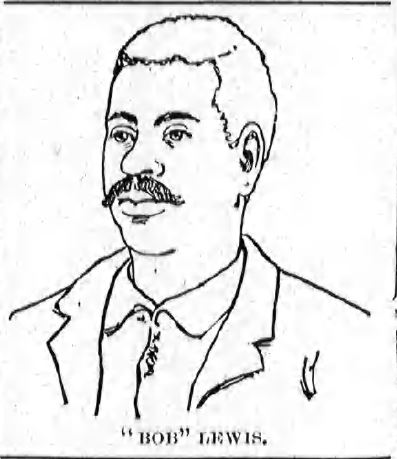
- Robert Lewis, illustrated in The Tri-States Union.
- Born: 1864; United States
- Died: June 2, 1892 (aged 27–28); Port Jervis, New York, U.S.
- Cause of death: Lynching

Robert Lewis was a 28-year-old African American man who was lynched in Port Jervis, New York on June 2, 1892. His lynching was attended by what the local newspaper reported was a mob of 2,000 people, and may have inspired Stephen Crane's novella The Monster.

== Assault on Lena McMahon ==
On or about June 2, 1892, a young white woman named Lena McMahon was assaulted on the banks of the Neversink River, where she had been meeting with her estranged suitor, a white man named Peter J. Foley. Foley claimed that there had been black men or boys fishing in the area. According to Foley, when he stepped away to get sandwiches, McMahon was viciously assaulted by one of the black men. He claimed he saw a man fitting Lewis' description fleeing the scene when he returned with the sandwiches.

Foley fled the area shortly after the attack and was confronted by McMahon's father in a billiard hall. Foley reportedly lunged at Mr. McMahon's head with a pool cue and escaped. He was ultimately apprehended either in a nearby rail yard or while boarding a train at a train station. Foley, according to the Middletown Times-Press of nearby Middletown, New York, was 32 years old, had been in Port Jervis for less than a year, had been released in March from a two-month stint in jail for failing to pay a boarding bill and had been working at a billiard hall since that time. It was reported that Foley had been "paying attention to [McMahon] contrary to the wishes of her parents" and that "the feeling in the community against him [was] very strong."

Lewis was arrested on a boat in the Delaware and Hudson Canal in Huguenot, New York not long after the assault. Authorities struggled to keep crowds away from him while in Huguenot. While being transported to the police station, Lewis allegedly confessed that he and Foley arranged for Foley to bring McMahon to the riverbank and then leave her unattended so that Lewis could assault her.

== Lynching ==
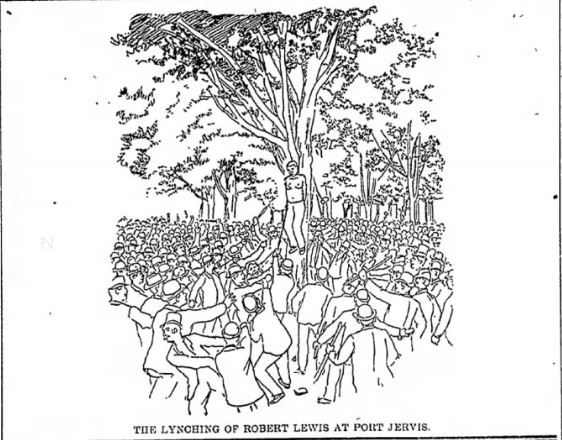
Illustration of lynching from The Evening World

When the police arrived at the jail in Port Jervis with Lewis, a crowd reportedly surrounded their wagon and stole Lewis away from the police. Both his hands and feet were bound and he was dragged through the streets of the city by a noose which was placed around his neck. By the time Lewis was hung by the neck from a maple tree, he was reportedly so badly beaten that he was nearly dead already. Several community leaders reportedly tried to dissuade the crowd but other witnesses told a reporter that a prominent physician and state officeholder urged the mob on. Lewis was hung multiple times, taken down, found to still be alive and re-hung. His body was left hanging from the tree for 30 to 60 minutes after his death before being taken down and left in the rain to be picked up by an undertaker.

Foley was taken to the county jail in Goshen, followed by a crowd, and "there [was] talk of lynching him too." One report estimated that there were 250 people on the train platform as he left Port Jervis for Goshen. A crowd also surrounded the county jail into the following morning but Foley was ultimately spared from the lynch mob.

Per a report in the Middletown Times-Press published the following day, public opinion on the lynching was divided but the "majority approve[d] and openly applaud[ed] the work of the lynchers, claiming that a terrible warning was necessary to prevent future repetitions of the same offence." However, according to the same article, "[t]he better sentiment of Port Jervis" was that the lynching was "one of the most disgraceful scenes" ever to occur in the city, if not Orange County.

=== Aftermath ===
A postmortem examination found that Lewis' neck had not been broken and that he had died of asphyxiation.

An inquest was held and most or all of the witnesses testified to the coroner's jury that they were trying to help the police to get Lewis back into custody and away from the mob. One man testified that he removed the noose from Lewis' neck several times only for the crowd to replace it, though he claimed not to recognize any of the participants. The coroner claimed never to have seen anything so remarkable as a man being lynched despite no testimony that any of the "1,000 or more people" present interfered with the efforts of the police to protect him. The jury returned a verdict that he was hung by a "person or persons unknown to the jury."
